= List of villages in Saharsa district =

This is a comprehensive list of villages (by subdivision block) in Saharsa district in Bihar State.

== Nauhatta ==
- Asnahi Patti
- Auria Ramouti
- Bakaunia
- Baksuar
- Balwa
- Balugaon urf Chhatra
- Bariyahi bazar
- Bangaon
- Bangaon Arazi
- Barhara
- Bariahi
- Bhakua
- Bhelahi
- Birjain
- Chandrain
- Chhataun
- Darhar
- Deoka
- Dibra
- Dhanga
- Dharampur
- Dharhara
- Dumra
- Ekarh
- Enaetpur
- Feqrahi
- Garhia
- Garhia Lohir
- Gobindpur
- Hati
- Hempur
- Kadli patti
- Kaithwar
- Kaliali
- Kasimpur
- Kathwar Arazi
- Kharka telwa
- Kumhrauli
- Lalpur
- Mahua
- Mohammadpur
- Mohanpur
- Majhaul
- Muradpur
- Murlipur
- Narainpur
- Narga
- Nauhatta
- Naula
- Paliarpur
- Panduba
- Parkhotimpur
- Partaha
- Rampur
- Rasulpur
- Sataur
- Shahpur
- Tikpuli Chak Khuti Badh

== Banma Itahri ==
- Afzalpur
- Badshah Nagar
- Deokal
- Ghordaur
- HathMandaldihl
- Itahri
- Jamal Nagar
- Kasimpur
- Khorasan
- Kusmhi
- Lalpur
- Maharas
- Murli
- Rasalpur
- Sahuria
- Sarbela
- Shamsuddinpur
- Tarha
- Sugma
- Sahuria

== Satar Kataiya ==
- Agwanpur
- Aran
- Baghi urf Bhaluasukhasan
- Baijnathpur
- Bara
- Barahsher
- Bela
- Bijalpur
- Bishunpur
- Chinwari
- Dahaha Badh
- Gandaul
- Ghina
- Gangaura Behra
- Gobargarha urf jarsain
- Hasa Hakpur
- Itahri
- Kharik Badh
- Lachhminia
- Laukahi
- Makuna
- Matiari Badh
- Nandlali
- Pachgachhia
- Padumpur
- Panidaha
- Patori
- Pipra
- Purushottam Pur(Purikh)
- Rakeapatti
- Rohua Arazi
- Sadhua Badh
- Sattar
- Shahpur
- Sihaul
- Sisai
- Tuniahi
- Ukahi
- HAKPARA,..

== Salkhua ==
- Alani
- Baldehi
- Banganwan
- Bankatti
- Basahi
- Bhelwa
- Bhirkhi
- Chanan
- Chhachhua
- Chiraia
- Gaurdah
- Goriyari
- Gauri
- Gauspur
- Gurganwan
- Harinsari
- Harewa
- Kabira
- Kabirpur
- Kamra
- Kathghara
- Khajur bana
- Khochardewa
- Koparia
- Kotwalia
- Kuchaut
- Mamarkha
- Puraini
- Raingnian
- Sahoria
- Sahsaili Thuthi
- Sahuria
- Salkhua
- Samhar Kalan
- Samhar Khurd
- Sauthi
- Shahganwan
- Situahi
- Tajpur
- Utesra
- Phensaha
- Mangaltola
- Khograha

== Kahra ==
- Amarpur
- Amarpur
- Balhapatti
- Balhapatti Arazi
- Baluaha
- Bangaon
- Bariahi
- Basauna
- Bharauli
- Bhuswarh Dih
- Bishunpur
- Bishunpur
- Chainpur Uttar Khand
- Deojaji
- Deona Gopal
- Dewari
- Dhagjari
- Dholi
- Dighia
- Garahiapatti
- Harpur
- Kahra
- Kandaha
- Kharagpur
- Kharagpur
- Mohanpur
- Murli
- Nariyar
- Parri
- Parwania
- Parwania
- Patuwaha
- Rohua
- Rohuamon
- Siradipatti
- Solindabad
- Tulsiahipatti
- Dhakjari

== Simri Bakhtiyarpur ==
- Agar
- Aini
- Ashraf Chak
- Baghwa
- Baidi
- Bakhtiarpur
- Balhampur
- Balhi
- Balthi
- Baluapar
- Balutola
- Barsam
- Basatpur
- Belwara
- Bhagdewa
- Bhagwanpur
- Bhatauni
- Bhauara
- Bhorha
- Bhotia
- Bindpur
- Chak Bharo
- Chapram
- Dhanupra
- Ghoghsan
- Gopalpur
- Bhatpura(Hamidpur)
- Hario
- Kantho
- Kathdumar
- Khajuri
- Khamauti
- Khoju Chak
- Kusmi
- Lagma
- Madanpur
- Madhuban
- Mahammadpur
- Mahkhar
- Manjhwa
- Mohanpur
- Motihani
- Nainpur
- Naltigarh
- Paharpur
- Paharpur
- Raipura
- Rampur
- Saraunja
- Saraunja Thana Sitanabad
- Sardiha
- Shankarpur
- Simri
- Sisauni
- Sonpura
- Sukhasan
- Tariawan
- Tulsiyahi
- Teghra
- Tilanthi
- Turki
- Chakmaka

== Mahishi ==
- Aina
- Aina Sohagpur
- Mahpura
- Amahi
- Ara
- Baghaud
- Baghaud
- Baghwa
- Baghwa Hat Abad
- Bahrampur
- Balia
- Bareta
- Bhanthi
- Bharwar
- Bhelahi Kalan Khurd
- Bihna
- Bijwar
- Birgango
- Birwar
- Chatania
- Dhanauj
- Dhapari
- Dharampur
- Dhor
- Dhor
- Dumri
- Gamrahu
- Gangauni
- Garaul
- Ghoghpur
- Jalai
- Jalkaur
- Jhara
- Jhitki
- Kandaha
- Kargaon
- Karhara
- Khairaha
- Kodwa
- Kundali
- kumhara
- Lohaur
- Mahesraho
- Mahishi
- Maina
- Mahpura
- Maina Arazi
- Manaur
- Mangrauni
- murli
- Nagar
- Naharwa
- Nakauch
- Nawada
- Nonia
- Panchbhinda
- Paranpur
- Parewa
- Pastwar
- Pokharbhinda
- Rajhanpur
- Rakhti
- Sahorwa
- Samani
- Sapaita
- Sarauni
- Simar
- Sirwar
- Sisauna
- Sonkurthua
- Supaul
- Tarhi
- Teghra
- Telbadha
- Telhar
- Telwa
- Thanwar

== Saur Bazar ==
- Lilmani gram Khaira
- Ajgaiba Roshan Kumar
- Baijnathpur
- Bakhri
- Bancholha
- Bansi Rauta
- Barahi
- Barsam
- Barsamkhopatti
- Bhabtia
- Bhada
- Bhagwanpur
- Bhulia
- Chakla
- Chandour
- Chikni Dakhinwari
- Chikni Darmeani(Boss Tola)
- Chikni Uttarwari(Murgi Tola)
- Dan Chakla
- Damgadhi
- Dham Sena
- Gamharia
- Garhia
- Hanuman Nagar Chakla
- Indarwa
- Jiwachhpur Pachhiari Patti
- Jiwachhpur Purwari
- Kabela
- Kabela Chak
- Kachra
- Kachradaun
- Kanp
- Karahia
- Khajuri
- Lachhminia
- Madhura
- Nado
- Phursaha
- Raghunathpur
- Rampur
- Rauta Khem
- Rohua
- Sahuria
- Saur
- Saur Bazar
- Silet
- Suhath
- Tiri
- mushar niya
- Lilmani gram Khaira

== Sonbarsa ==
- Agma
- Amrita
- Atlakha
- Baisa
- Baitha Masahri
- Balia Ekduari
- Barahi
- Baraith
- Bargaon
- Barsam
- Basnahi
- Behta
- Belhat
- Bhada
- Bhasti
- Bhaura
- Biratpur
- Dehad
- Dumra
- Durgapur
- Fatehpur
- Gazi Paita
- Goalpura
- Goari
- Gonram
- Harpur
- Jalsiman
- Jhitkia
- Kasnagar
- Khajuraha
- Kolhait
- Kopa
- Lagma
- Lagma Patti
- Mahua Patti Dakhin wari
- Mahua Patti Uttarwari
- Maina
- Malandh Pattiuttarwari
- Malaud Patti
- Manguar
- Manori
- Maura
- Mokma
- Nanauti
- Pacharhi
- Pachlakh
- Padumpur
- Paita
- Paman
- Pararia
- Raghunathpur
- Rakhauta
- Sahmaura
- Sahsaul
- Sarauni Madhepura
- Shahpur
- Sirrahi
- Soha
- Sonbarsa Raj

== Patarghat ==
- Bara Singhia
- Bhaddi
- Bishunpur
- Dhabauli
- Golma
- Jalaiya Madhepura tola
- Jirwa
- Jamhra
- Kapasia
- Kishunpur
- Laxmipur
- Paharpur
- Pama
- Pastpar
- Patarghat
- Sahgaura
- Sahuria
- Sakhauri
