= Khajuraha =

- village
- Location in Bihar, India Khajuraha (India)
- Coordinates: 25.41°N 86.42°E
- Country: India
- State: Bihar
- District: Saharsa district
- Named for: Khajuraha
- Talukas: Sonbarsha Raj

Government
  - Type: Government of India
  - Body: Saharsa

Area
  - Total: 7.69 km^{2} (2.97 sq mi)
- Elevation (Above sea level): 46 m (151 ft)

Population (2011)
  - Total: 8,291

Languages
  - Official: Maithili, Hindi
- Time zone: UTC+5:30 (IST)
- PIN: 852217
- Telephone code: 06475
- Nearest city: SAHARSA
- Lok Sabha constituency: Madhepura
- Vidhan Sabha constituency: Sonbarsha Raj
- Climate: Normal (Köppen)

Khajuraha is an ancient northern Indian village situated in the Saharsa district of Bihar. It is one of the largest panchayats of the state, both by area and population. The origin of the name Khajuraha is unknown. Khajuraha is part of Sonbarsa Raj block of Saharsa district. Some of the neighbouring places include Chandiasthan Gazipaita (2 km south), Biratpur, Lagma, and Golma. Saint Pritamnath (Babajee) lived in this village.

== Geography ==
Khajuraha and its surrounding area lies in a flat alluvial plain, forming part of the Kosi river basin. This makes the land very fertile.

Flooding was historically a major reason for the poor connectivity of the area, as bridges tended to get washed away. Newer roads are more stable, and there has been less flooding in the last few decades.

== Population ==
Khajuraha is a highly populated village, but with a good distribution and considerable space between tollas. As per the 2011 Population Census, Khajuraha village has a total population of 8291, consisting of 4358 males and 3933 females. As a result, the sex ratio of Khajuraha village is about 9:10 females to males, slightly lower than, but similar to, other surrounding villages in Bihar. However, the sex ratio of children is more equal in Khajuraha. Per the 2011 census report, the literacy rate is around 51.26%. Males have a higher literacy rate at 62.61%, with female literacy at 38.59%.

== Agriculture ==
Khajuraha and its surrounding areas are largely dependent on agriculture. Agriculture remained prime occupation for villagers since a long time. Total economy of this village is either dependent on agriculture or service class occupations. The farmers in the village mostly cultivate Dhaan (paddy crop), Makai (maize), Gahum (wheat) and Moong (a type of lentil) in their farms. Since the climate of this region is most suitable for Dhaan (the paddy crop), a good crop brings happiness to many farmers in the village. Though, people do try to grow wheat crops, only few farmers get good yields. Most of the farmers have moderate harvest and hence it is not as popular as harvesting of Dhaan. Instead, maize is the second-best crop for the farmers of this village. The timing of Dhaan harvesting is especially notable as the villagers are happy in general for several reasons. The reaping of the crop starts somewhere around mid November and is usually followed by some of the most important Hindu festivals namely Durga Puja and Diwali. Six days after Diwali brings another festival called Chhath which is one of major festivals of Bihar. In between, Diwali and Chhath is another festival that is known as Bhardootiya (Bhai Dooj) in which brothers go to see their sisters. So before the onset of the harvesting the festive mood is already set and green fields that start showing the golden shades of ripe Dhaan crop are extremely pleasant to watch. Now for nearly two months it is the time of farmers to remain cheerful. The fresh crop of Dhaan reaches every home. Whether you are owner of the land, or the farmer or just the harvester, the Dhaan is bound to come to every household. It can be cooked straight or flattened to make Chura (flaked rice) which makes an amazing food when combined with fresh Sakkar (Jaggery) and "Dahi" (Curd). It has been observed that farmers tried to opt for different crops also like sunflower, banana farming but could not get much success.

Villagers grow potatoes, brinjal, Parwal, onions and other vegetables. But those productions are only limited for their own consumption and does not have any commercial values for farmers. Similarly, fruits like mango, banana, coconut, litchi, guava, papaya are grown in Khajuraha, but mostly consumed by villagers only.

In past, Khajuraha was famous in cultivating sugarcane and Jute. But we all know that Jute industry was heavily effected after partition and that affected Jute cultivation in Khajuraha also Similar story was observed for Sugar production in Bihar.

== Art and culture ==
Ram Navmi, Holi, Durga Puja and Chhath are the main festival of Khajuraha. There is a famous Mahavir sthan in this village. There is an ancient Peepal tree in the village and every family of this village are the followers of that tree and they have been believing this from the ancient era that Lord Hanumaan is present there and always protects them from all the crisis. Later Villagers made Hanumaan temple near the Tree in 1992. There is one Shiva Temple which was built at the same place. Ram Navmi is celebrated every year with grandiosity at the temple in Khajuraha.

=== Holi ===
The celebration of Holi is three-day long in Khajuraha. The first day being Dhurkhel (playing with dirt) and the second day for colours and third day is for Mahavir Holi. The Holi festival in this village is normally celebrated one day in advance to the rest of the country. During the Holi festival, people get to meet each other. Many people from this village who live in other cities of India and abroad come back home on this occasion to be with their family. Traditionally, people used to go in groups beating drums and singing Holi songs and Jogiras. At few places, there are big stocks of bhang (a cannabis intoxicant) in the form of Dudhbhanga (milk laced with bhaang extracts and dry fruits), Tikri (a type of Indian sweet stuffed with bhaang) and bhangjilebi (another Indian sweet laced with bhaang). Elders are greeted with this intoxicant but youngsters also find a way to have this.

Villagers make one holi toli and they visit every home of village and whole villagers enjoy together first and second day. Whereas, All villagers gather at hanuman sthan on third day and celebrate Mahavir Holi.

=== Ram Navmi ===
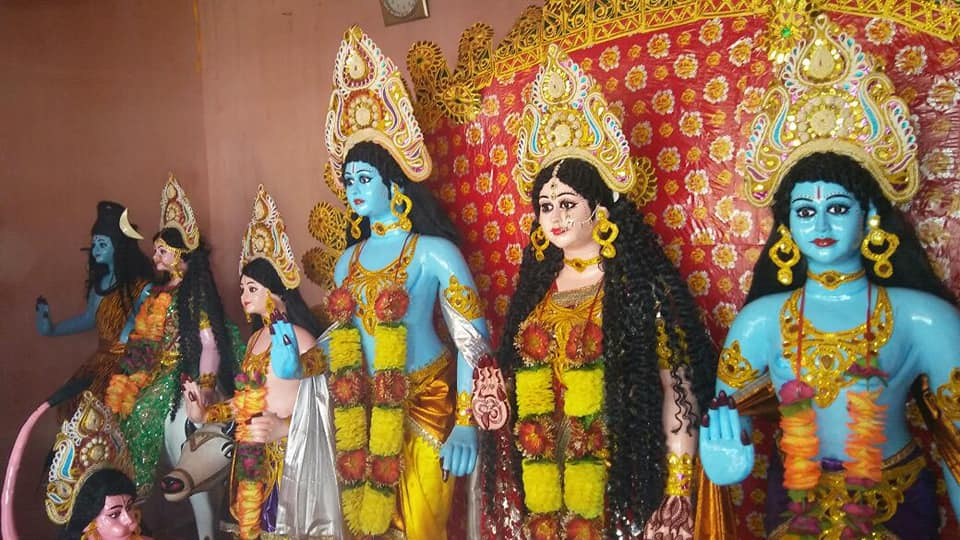
Ram Navmi statue of Khajuraha

Ram Navmi is one of the most famous festival where all the villagers can be seen participating. The major events of this festival are Ram Janam (Sri Ram's birth anniversary celebration), Mela (Fair) and Bhasaan (immersion of the idol in Mani Kanth Jha's pokhad situated in village). Because of Mela, many relatives from nearby villages visit. This is very popular for kids and younger people as well as females of the village. Kids go to this fair for buying toys that can't usually be bought because of the unavailability. On the other hand, females seem interested in shopping cosmetics and some household items. The elder males feel happy in taking their grandchildren to the fair and shop for them. Usually elders are not seen shopping other than sweets and Paan. In past, there used to have some cultural nights program but recently villagers opted to go for clean Puja program and are not arranging cultural nights.

=== Durga Puja ===
Oldest temple of Bihar Maa Chandika Bhawani Temple is situated just 1 km south from Khajuraha. It is said that Chandi maa temple was created in Dvapara Yuga (era) and it was the capital of ‘King Birat’ therefore its surrounding village is called as Biratpur. It is said that the five Pandavas with their wife Draupadi spent the period of agyaatvaas here. There are some conflict between Birtapur of this place and Biratnagar of Nepal regarding Pandavas spending their time during agyaatvaas.

Chandi Sthan

It is one of the important and viewable places in 51 Shakti peeth because head of Maa Sati is available in this temple. Chandi sthan is an archaeological site as villagers surrounding this village have frequently found bronze plates in the area. Chandi Sthan is also famous for Managal Mela (local fair on every Tuesday) and durga puja fair. People from the surrounding villages of Biratpur, Khajuraha, Jalseema, Nanoiti, Atalkha, Sahsaul, Golma, etc. visit Chandi Sthan mostly on Tuesday. You can find a large rush of devotees on Tuesday and mostly during Navratri. It is said that there used to be huge fights among different villagers in past about first preference of Bali (sacrifice of goat) specially during Navratri. Later it was agreed among villagers and particular days were fixed for different village. Khajuraha was given first priority day during Navratri.

=== Chhath Puja ===
Chhath Puja is an important Hindu festival that is mainly celebrated in Bihar and some regions of Nepal. The puja is dedicated to the worship of the Sun god and his wife Usha. During the occasion, devotees perform puja to thank god for supporting life on earth and seek the divine couple's blessing.

According to Hindu religion, the Sun is believed to heal many severe health conditions and ensure longevity, prosperity, progress and well-being. People celebrate the festival by following a rigorous routine that lasts four days. The rituals include: fasting (including abstinence from drinking water), holy bathing, offering prayers to the rising and setting sun, and meditating by standing in water.

In addition to Bihar, many other states such as Jharkhand, eastern UP, regions of Nepal, Madhya Pradesh, Uttar Pradesh, Gujarat, Bangalore, Chandigarh, Chhattisgarh also fervently celebrate the festival. Chhath Puja is so called as it is celebrated on the sixth day of the month of Karthika in the Vikram Samvat. It is also celebrated in the summers, some days after Holi. However, Karthika month's Chhath is more ardently followed by people.

Chhath Puja is celebrated at grand scale in Khajuraha. Villagers mostly celebrate Chhath Puja on Mani Kanth Jha's Pokhad but there are some other Pokhad also where Chhath puja are celebrated. Recently villagers have started cultural program in Chhath Puja night.

== Society, religion and safety ==
The village population consists of Maithil Brahmins mostly. Brahmins, by definition of the social classification in ancient India, are the highest-ranked. The Brahmins are traditionally supposed to have teaching as their profession. After independence this population of Maithil Brahmins have been involved in all profession such as administration, engineers, doctors, farming, business, serving the military and para-military forces to name a few. Apart from Brahmins, Rajputs, Kalwar (Baniya) and Sonar (Goldsmith) also live in Brahmins tola. Many others belonging to the other castes also reside but in other tola called as Baghial. Bagail is mostly dominated by Yadav caste. There is a small percentage of Muslims as well who mostly live in the Miyaaantoli area of the village. These Muslims of the village rely predominantly on growing vegetables for their livelihood (often referred as Kujras).

== Natural calamities ==
=== Flood ===
Khajuraha is part of Kosi Region which is known as the sorrow of Bihar. So it was common to have flood situations in almost all villages of Saharsa district in past. Kosi embankment was created and completed by 1950 and since then Khajuraha and its surrounding villages had not seen major flooding. Whereas in September 1984, Kosi embankment breached near Nauhatta in Supaul district and that resulted major flood situations in Saharsa district. Khajuraha village was not flooded fully but its surrounding villages were heavily effected and Khajuraha became like islands and almost got connectivity with the surrounding area after one week. In 2008, Kosi River once again changed its course but it affected mainly surrounding districts like Madhepura and Supaul. However, flooding or water logging due to heavy monsoon rains is a major reason for the poor connectivity of the Khajuraha as bridges in surrounding villages tend to get washed away.

Recently Aapda Bhavan have been created near Babaji Kutti. Aapda Bhavan have been created to give shelter to villagers and their cattle if flood-like situations will come again in future.

=== Earthquake ===
Apart from floods, the seismic activity of Himalayan region is responsible for earthquakes that this village has faced. It is believed that the Indian plate is penetrating into the Eurasian plate at a rate of 5 cm/year. Because of this movement, this reason is prone to earthquakes too. In 1934, a massive earthquake in the village that caused much damage. Back again in 1988, there was another quake of much lower intensity which affected only the few buildings in the village. None of the homes were toppled. On the night of quake in 1988, The ground started shaking and people rushed outside to seek refuge. The tube wells and wells in the village started pouring water out but nobody was hurt. After that earthquakes have been experienced again in April 2015, but this had little impact and there were no reported casualties.

=== Fire (Aagjani) ===
In the past, fire was common in Indian villages during March–April because of huts. Indian huts are made from bamboo and hays which are very prone to fire. Even villagers were using woods and cow dung cakes for cooking, so catching fire was common in village but due to strong wind during March and April fire used to spread fast in surrounding area. Khajuraha has seen major fire in 1988 when almost all houses of Brahmins tollas were burnt. Only few houses near Hanuman Sthan were not burnt. There was heavy property damage in that fire as people did not get time to bring out their belongings from house before it caught fire.

After that year, villagers stopped building huts and started building houses made from bricks and Irons. Now, Khajuraha has very few houses made from bamboo and hays. Fire is not common, but the fear of fire among villagers and extra precautions are taken in case of any reported fire inside and outside Khajuraha.

== Sports ==
Football was famous and most liked game during the 1990s but current generation are preferring to play cricket. A cricket tournament is being held every year at Khajuraha field where almost all the surrounding villages participate.

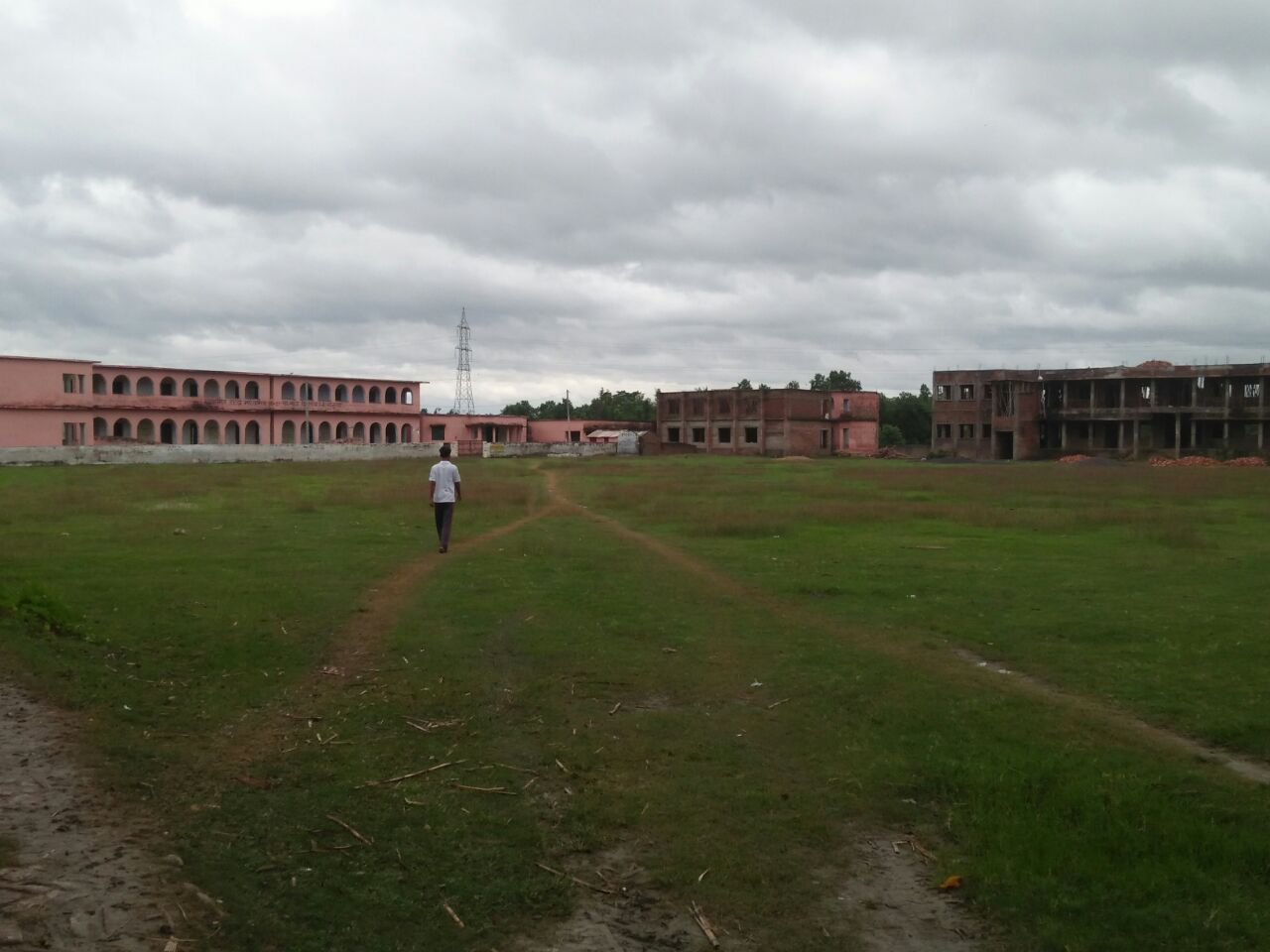

Other Popular games are :

1. Kabaddi
2. Cricket
3. Volleyball
4. Pitto (local game)
5. Seven stone Pitto (local game)

== Education ==
=== Colleges ===
There is no any college situated particularly in Khajuraha. Nearby colleges are in Biratpur and Sonbarsha. But students from Khajuraha village prefer to go other cities for higher educations.

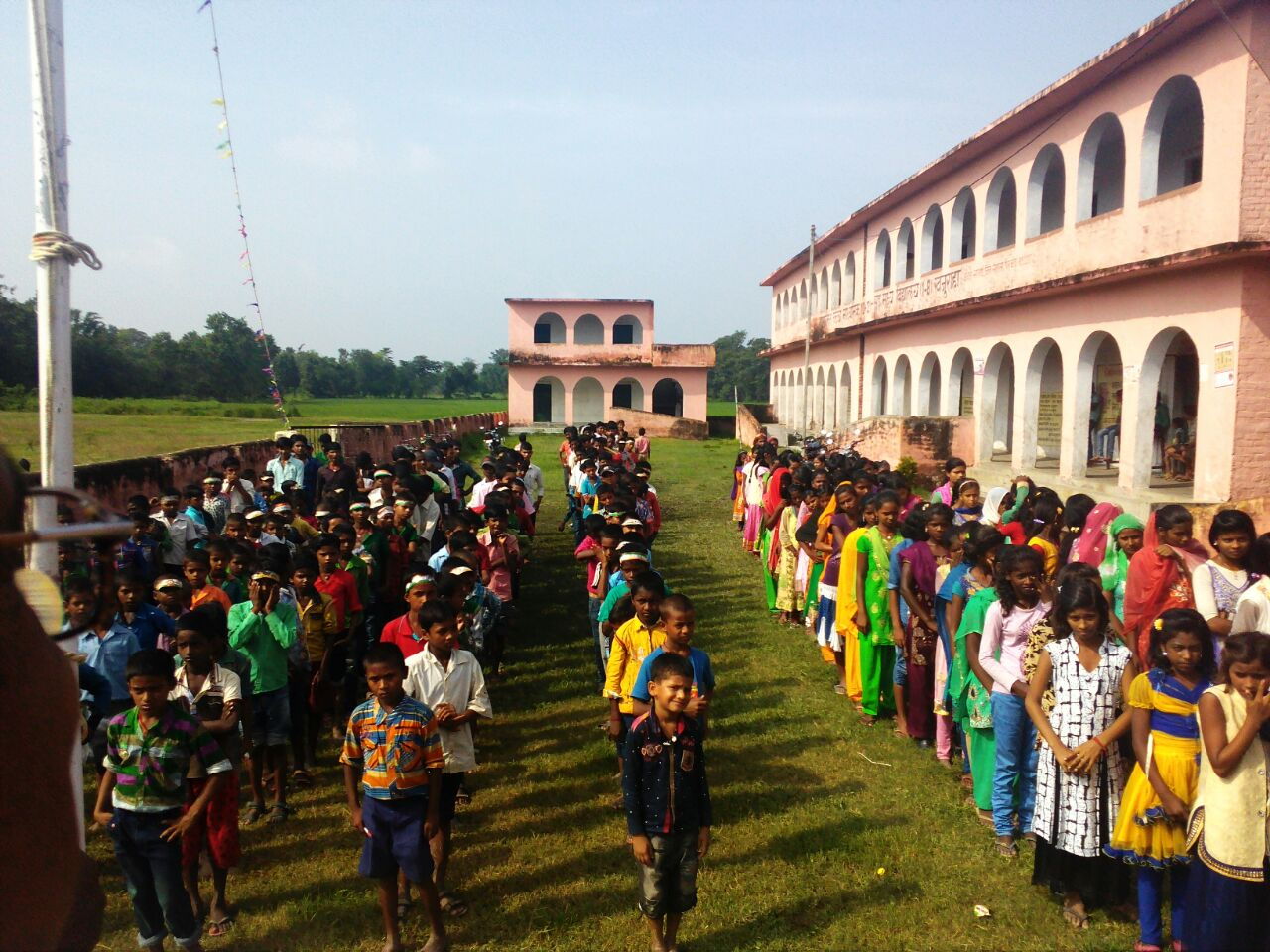

=== High schools ===
- Senior secondary school (+2), Khajuraha
- Chandi High School, Biratpur

=== Schools ===
- Middle School, Khajuraha
- Kanya Middle School, Khajuraha
- Primari School, Khajuraha
- Middle school, Baghail

== See also ==
- Saharsa – the Municipality
- Saharsa district – the Municipality
- List of villages of Saharsa
