= Baghwa =

Baghwa Tiger Village
- village
- Location in Bihar, India Baghwa (India)
- Coordinates: 25.79°N 86.48°E
- Country: India
- State: Bihar
- Region: Mithila
- District: Saharsa
- Founder: MANMOD BABA
- Named for: IAS/IPS OFFICER

Government
  - Type: BIHAR GOVT.
- Elevation: 41 m (135 ft)

Languages
  - Official: Hindi, Maithili
- Time zone: UTC+5:30 (IST)
- PIN: 852106
- Telephone code: 06478
- Vehicle registration: BR
- Sex ratio: 1000 females per 1000 males ♂/♀ ♂/♀

Baghwa is a village situated in the south west corner of Saharsa district in the north Indian state of Bihar. It is a small village by population, but its area is not that small. This village is also known as IAS/IPS officer village. It is surrounded by two water channels, being Sathrath (which merges into the Ganges) and Balwa dhar (koshi) which part it from Khagaria.

Baghwa is part of Simri Bakhtiyarpur Block and khagaria constituency. Some of the neighbouring places include Mahishi (5 km north), bangaon, Chainpur, khajuri (2 km east) and Balwa Haat (3 km east). Baghwa is divided into three sections (sub blocks) namely Baghwa Gaon, Majhwa and Gopalpur.

Baghwa and its surrounding areas are part of the Kosi river basin.

== Education ==
=== Colleges ===
- R.P.H.S INTER COLLEGE Baghwa

=== Schools ===
- Raam Padarath Ramayani High School
- Middle School Baghwa

== See also ==
- Saharsa – the municipality
- List of villages in Saharsa district
