= Sihaul =

- Village
- Location in Bihar, India Sihaul (India)
- Coordinates: 25.9405172°N 86.5120083°E
- Country: India
- State: Bihar
- Region: Mithila
- District: Saharsa
- Elevation: 48.2 m (158 ft)

Population (2011)
  - Total: 15,143
- Time zone: UTC+05:30 (IST)
- PIN: 852124
- Telephone code: 06478
- ISO 3166 code: IN-BR
- Vehicle registration: BR
- Sex ratio: 903 females per 1000 males ♂/♀ ♂/♀
- Regional Language: Maithili
- Additional languages: Hindi, Urdu, English

Sihaul is a village with population of about 15,000 in the sub-district of Satar Kataiya, where it ranks as the second most populous village. The sub-district forms a part of Saharsa district in the state Bihar, India. The geographical area of the village is 9 km^{2} (3.5 sq mi) and it is the third biggest village by area in the sub-district. Population density of the village is 1287 persons per km2.

The nearest town to the village is the district headquarters at Saharsa, 14 km (8.7 mi) distance . The village has its own post office and the pin code of Sihaul village is 852124. The village comes under Sihaul panchayat. Sattarkattya is the sub-district headquarters.

Sihaul is surrounded by Bara, Lalganj, Rohua, Tulsiahi, Dorma, Bihra etc. Sihaul and its surrounding areas are a flat alluvial plain forming part of the Kosi (Dudh Kosi) river basin. This makes the land very fertile. However, frequent changes in the course of the Kosi River, one of the largest tributaries of the Ganges, have led to soil erosion.

== Demographics ==
The village is home to about 15,000 people, among them 7857 (53%) are male and 7286 (47%) are female. 91% of the whole population are from general caste, 9% are from schedule caste and 0% are schedule tribes. Child (aged under 6 years) population of Sihaul village is 18%, among them 53% are boys and 47% are girls. There are 2897 households in the village and an average 5 persons live in every family. In Sihaul village population of children with age 0-6 is 2011 which makes up 18.05% of total population of village. Average Sex Ratio of Sihaul village is 903 which is lower than Bihar state average of 918. Child Sex Ratio for the Sihaul as per census is 888, lower than Bihar average of 935.

The famous temple are Durga mandir (van Devi), Shiv mandir near sihaul chouk, shiv mandir near in west tola one of a Saraswati mandir in Rajput Tola. Main education Hubs are Shri Durga High school sihaul (having the capacity of almost five hundred matriculation pass out examinees and approx. one thousand students of standard VII, IX, and X). It is one of multi religious village in sahasra

There is also a river (DHAR) which is flowing from the middle of the village. Origin of this river is Koshi. In Sihaul many fairs are celebrated, such as kojagra, durga puja, and tajiya. Kojagra (laxmi puja) is the main fair and occurs after five days of durga puja, in which with puja a programme (orchestra) is held after puja for two days. →→→→

== Growth of populations ==
Population of the village has increased by 10.5% in last 10 years. In 2001 census total population here were about 10 thousand. Female population growth rate of the village is 8.4% which is -4.1% lower than male population growth rate of 12.5%. General caste population has increased by 9.8%; Schedule caste population has increased by 18.3% and child population has decreased by -1.6% in the village since last census.

== Sex Ratio - Females per 1000 Male ==
As of 2011 census there are 903 females per 1000 male in the village. Sex ratio in general caste is 891, in schedule caste is 1030 and in schedule tribe is 1000. There are 888 girls under 6 years of age per 1000 boys of the same age in the village. Overall sex ratio in the village has decreased by 34 females per 1000 male during the years from 2001 to 2011. Child sex ratio here has decreased by 75 girls per 1000 boys during the same time.

== Literacy ==
Total 4326 people in the village are literate, among them 2794 are male and 1532 are female. Literacy rate (children under 6 are excluded) of Sihaul is 47%. 58% of male and 35% of female population are literate here. Overall literacy rate in the village has increased by 10%. Male literacy has gone up by 9% and female literacy rate has gone up by 11%.

== Workers profile ==
Sihaul has 34% (3759) population engaged in either main or marginal works. 47% male and 19% female population are working population. 28% of total male population are main (full-time) workers and 20% are marginal (part-time) workers. For women 6% of total female population are main and 13% are marginal workers. The food crop in the village is paddy rice and wheat. Cash crops includes Makhana, Vegetables, Mango (of different quality and quantity well known in nearby villages), mustard, mecca (maize).

== How to reach Sihaul ==
Flooding is a major reason for the poor connectivity of the area as bridges tend to get washed away. Major flooding occurs almost annually, causing a significant loss of life and property but after 1984 no flood occurs in this area.

- By rail

The closest railway station is Saharsa Junction.

- By road

Saharsa and Supaul are the nearby by towns to Sihaul having road connectivity.

== See also ==
- List of villages of Saharsa
