= Matsyagandha Lake =

Artificial lake in Saharsa district of Northern Bihar, India

- मत्स्यगंधा (Hindi)
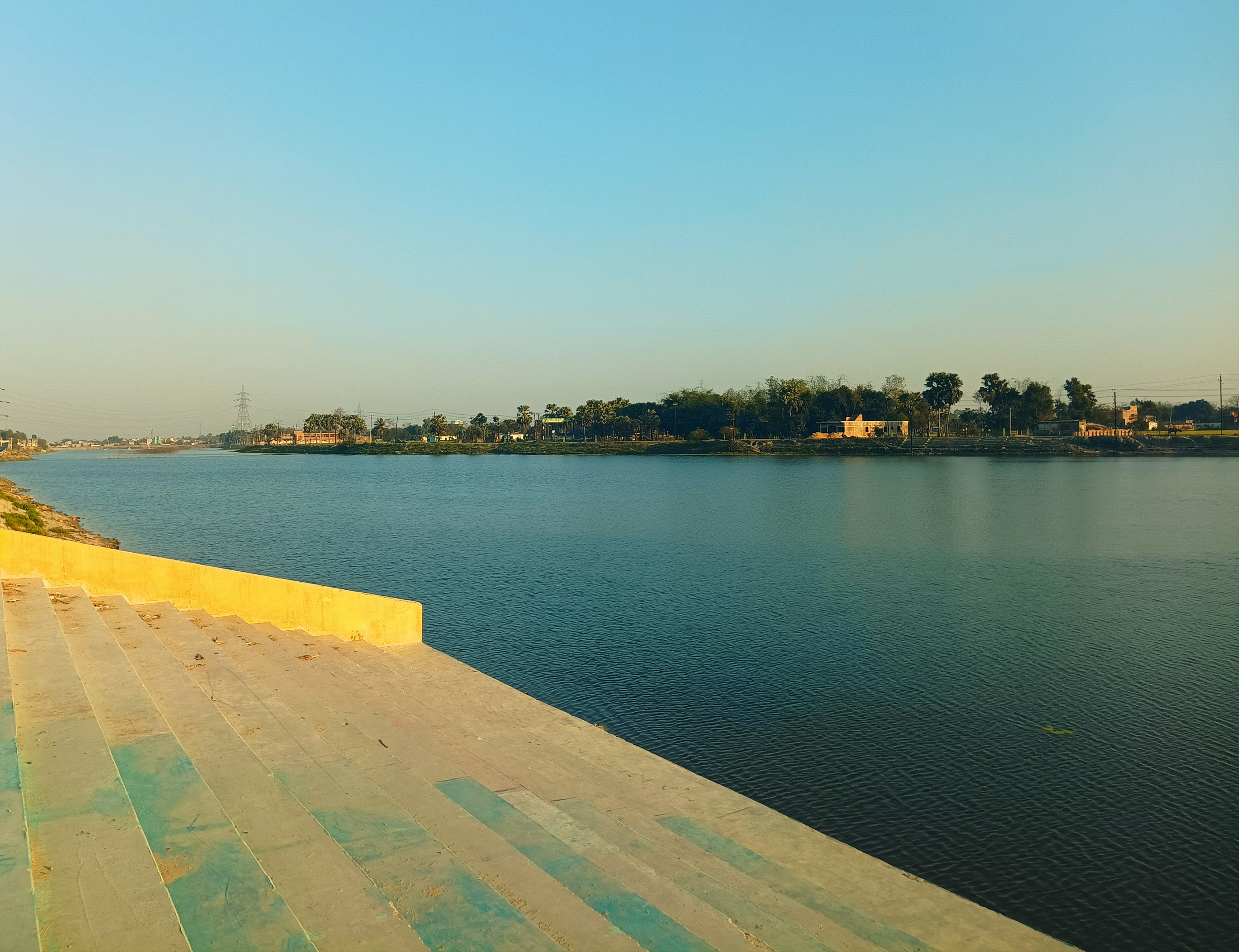

- Location within Bihar Location within India
- Interactive map of Matsyagandha Lake
- Location: Saharsa, Northern Bihar
- Coordinates: 25°54′15″N 86°35′15″E
- Type: Artificial lake
- Basin countries: India
- Built: 1996
- Max. length: 1.5 km (1 mi)
- Max. width: 200 m (660 ft)
- Surface area: 33 ha (82 acres)
- Water volume: 6,000 m^{3} (210,000 cu ft)
- Surface elevation: 42 m (138 ft)

Matsyagandha Lake (Hindi: मत्स्यगंधा) is a 1.5 km (1 mi) by 200 m (660 ft) artificial lake in the Sattar Kataiya block of Saharsa district of Northern Bihar region in India.

The lake was conceptualized in 1996, by the then Saharsa Collector, Tej Narayan Lal Das, as a development of wasteland used to cremate bodies.

As a result of neglect, the lake shrunk between 2006 and 2017, almost disappearing by 2018. In June 2020 the lake was planned to be renovated at the cost of ₹ 7.47 Crore (USD 1.02 M), by the Jal-Jeevan-Hariyali mission under the Government of Bihar, to be carried out by the State Department of Minor Water Resources, and includes increasing the depth by 2 metres (6 ft 7 in), expanding the size of the lake to 33 ha (82 acres), and capacity to 6,000 m^{3} (210,000 cu ft).

== Etymology ==
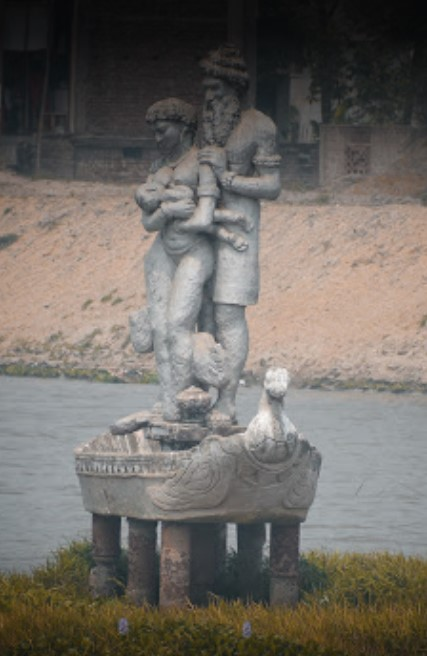
Bust of Matsyagandha and Parashar, holding rishi Vyas in the middle of the lake.

The name of the lake is derived from the semi-mythical character of Matsyagandha, the wife of King Shantanu. She is also the mother of the sage Vyas, fathered by the wandering rishi (sage) Parashara.

== Facilities ==
There is a Matsyagandha temple nearby, which houses a small temple pond with idols of Gods and Goddesses. The lake has the facility for boating and speed-boating at a chargeable basis, however, due to low water levels, boating is intermittent. There are plans for lake improvement for tourism by developing an 8 feet wide pavement lined with trees and park benches.
