= Chainpur, Saharsa, Bihar =

Chainpur, Saharsa
- Village
- Location in Bihar, India Chainpur, Saharsa (India)
- Coordinates: 25.52°N 86.31°E
- Country: India
- State: Bihar
- District: Saharsa
- Elevation: 41 m (135 ft)

Population (2001)
  - Total: 25,584

Languages
  - Official: Hindi, Maithili
- Time zone: UTC+5:30 (IST)
- PIN: 852212
- Telephone code: 06478
- ISO 3166 code: IN-BR

Chainpur is one of the largest villages of Saharsa District in the Indian state of Bihar in North-East India, and is in the Kosi Division. In the revenue documents, it is mentioned as 'Chainpur Uttar Khand'. Chainpur has a number of tolas and occasionally called Pubari, Pachhwari, Uttarwari and Dakshinwari tola.

Chainpur is part of Kahra Block. Chainpur is located in among Bariahi, Bangaon, Parari and Mahishi.

== Geography ==
Chainpur and its surrounding areas are a flat alluvial plain forming part of the Kosi river basin. This makes the land very fertile.

Flooding is a major reason for the poor connectivity of the area as bridges tend to get washed away.

== Agriculture ==
Paddy, wheat, moong, maize, sugarcane etc. are the main crops of this village. vegetables viz. potato, cauliflower, brinjal, carrot, radish, lady finger etc., are cultivated in this village.

== Art and Culture ==
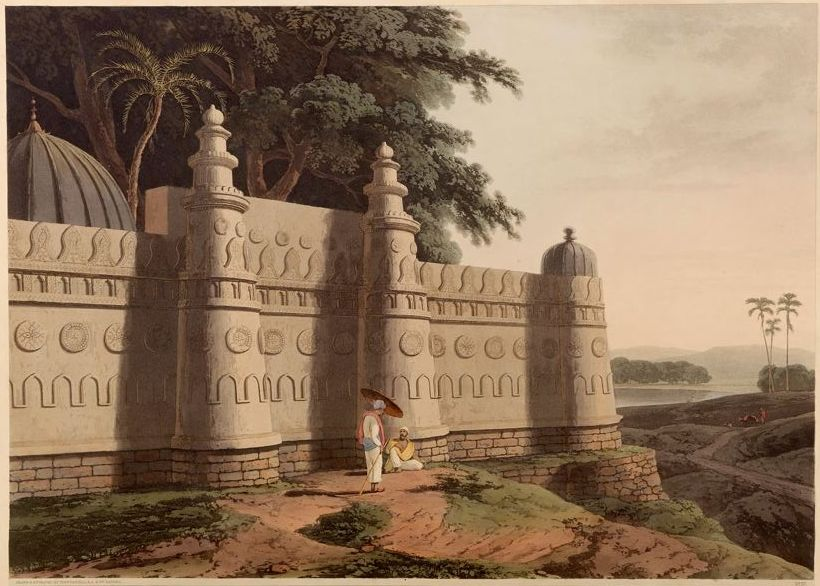
Chaynpore, Bahar, ca. 1790, by Thomas Daniell

Holi, Durga Puja and Kaali Puja are the main festival of Chainpur.Ramnavami, Janmashtami, Shivaratri, Hanuman jayanti etc. are also celebrated with full zest and fervour. Sama Chakeva, Chhath, Chaurchan etc. are other festivals of this village. Every year, a grand mela and wrestling Competition is organised on the occasion of Kali puja in the village.

== Education ==
=== College ===
- Bhagirath Kaalika Sanskrit College

=== Schools ===
In addition to a number of primary schools, following are the schools operating in Chainpur:

- Shashikala Middle School
- Nilkanth Balika Middle School
- Uchcha Vidyalay, chainpur-parari
- Kanya Uchcha vidyalay, parari-chainpur

== See also ==
- Saharsa – The Municipality
- List of villages of Saharsa
