= Biratpur =

- village
- Location in Bihar, India Biratpur (India)
- Coordinates: 25.70637°N 86.7934°E
- Country: India
- State: Bihar
- Region: Mithila
- District: Saharsa district

Languages
  - Official: Maithili, Hindi
- Time zone: UTC+5:30 (IST)
- Nearest city: saharsa
- Literacy: which%
- Website: saharsa.bih.nic.in

Biratpur is a village and panchayat located in the Sonbarsa Raj block, Saharsa District, Bihar state. It belongs to Kosi Division.

There are 6 villages under Biratpur's jurisdiction. List of the villages:

- Baisa
- Bhada
- Gazi Paita
- Goalpura
- Jalsiman
- Paita
