= Bargaon, Saharsa =

Village in Saharsa district, India

Bargaon
- Village
- Location in Bihar, India Bargaon (India)
- Coordinates: 25.7285°N 86.81883°E
- Country: India
- State: Bihar
- Region: Mithila
- District: Saharsa District

Population (2011)
  - Total: 7,857

Languages
  - Maithili, Hindi, English: Maithili, Hindi
- Time zone: UTC+5:30 (IST)
- ISO 3166 code: IN-BR
- Website: saharsa.bih.nic.in

Bargaon is a village situated in the Saharsa district of Bihar, India. It is located 32 km (20 mi) east of Saharsa and 199 km (124 mi) from the state capital, Patna.

As of 2011 the population was 7,857.

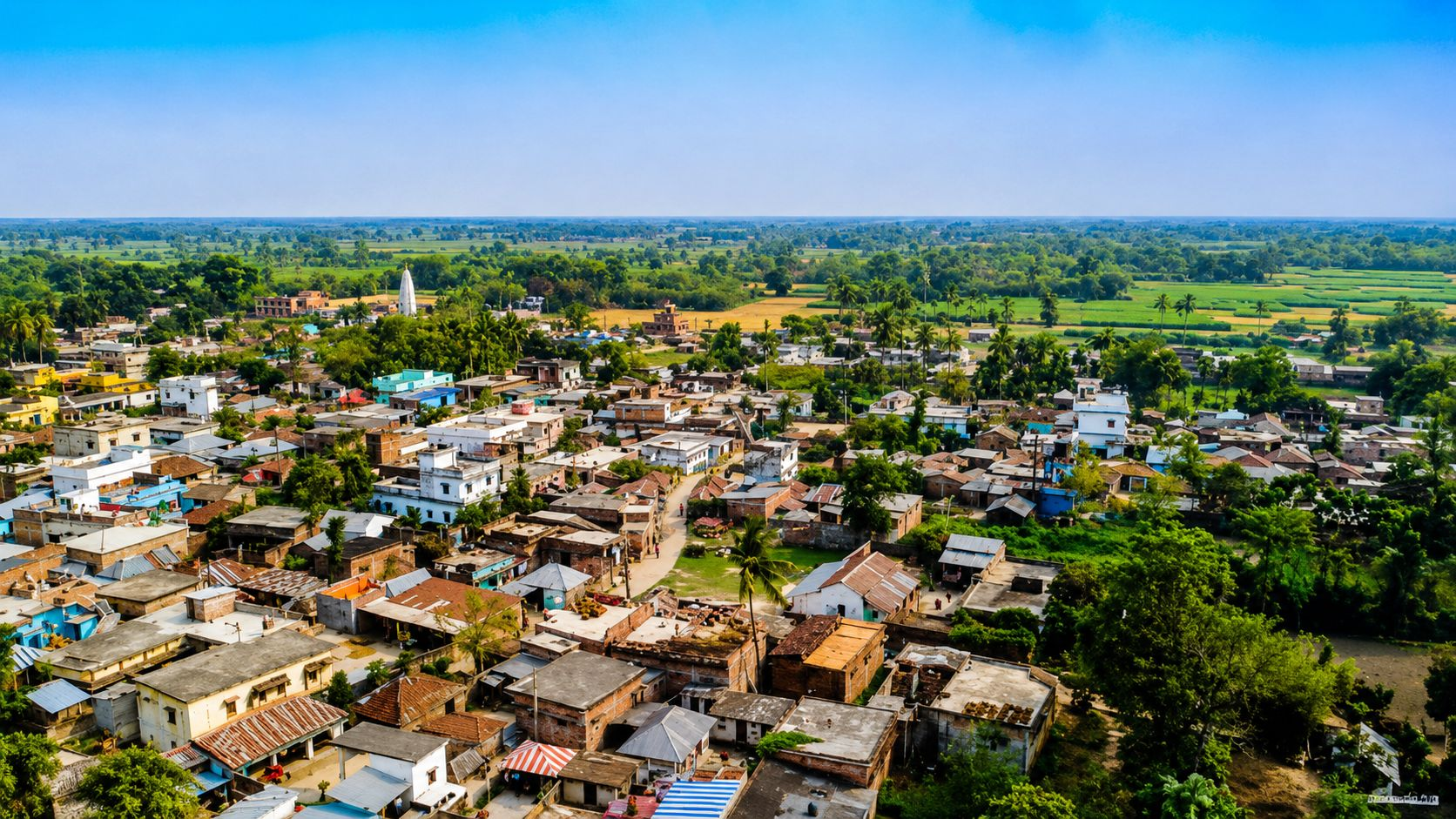
Bargaon

== Landmarks ==
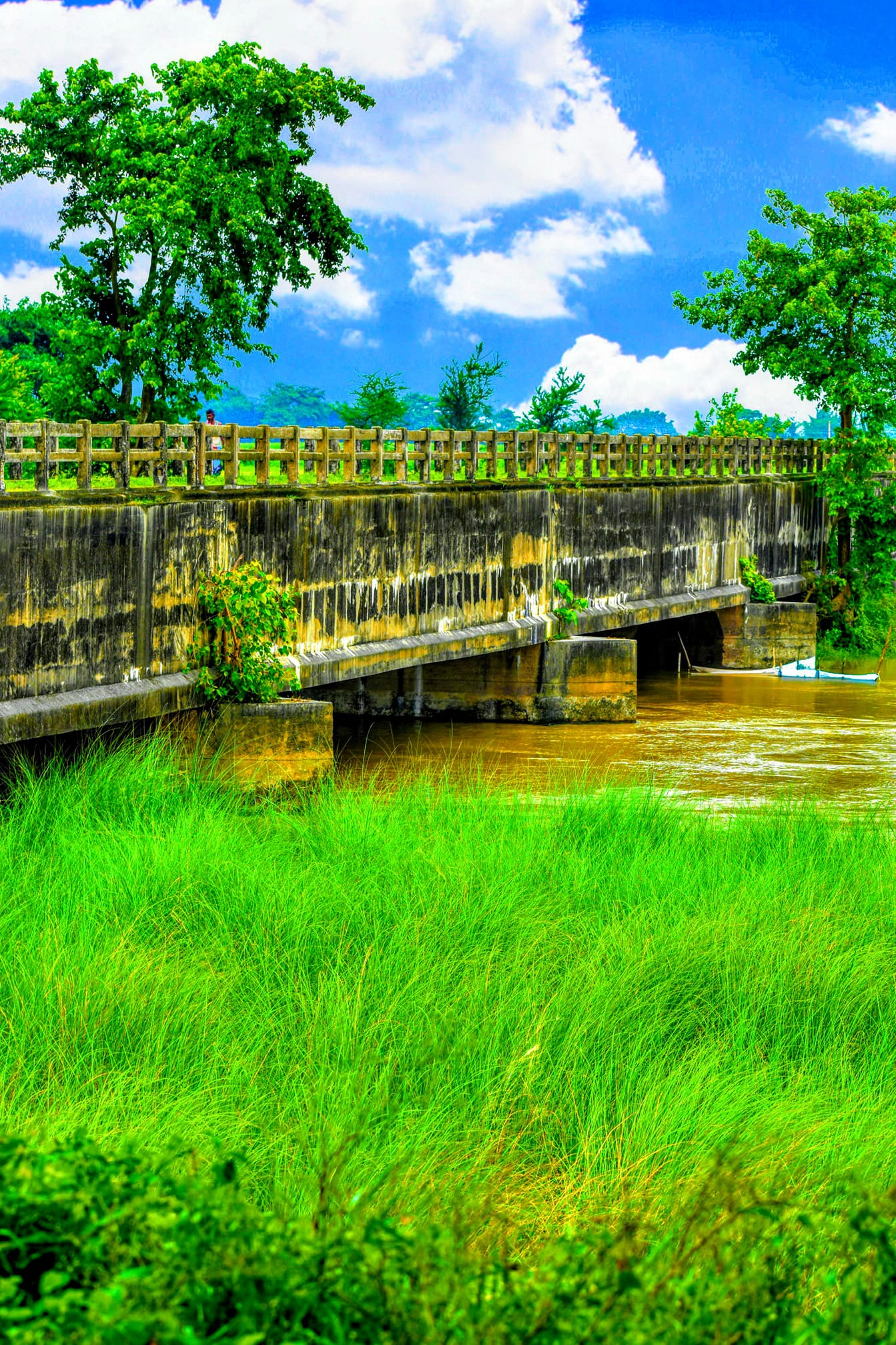
Siphon bridge

- Historic Siphon Bridge, built in the 1920s, used to pass canal (nahar) water over the Kosi river and provide local road connectivity.
- Bajrangbali (Hanuman) Temple

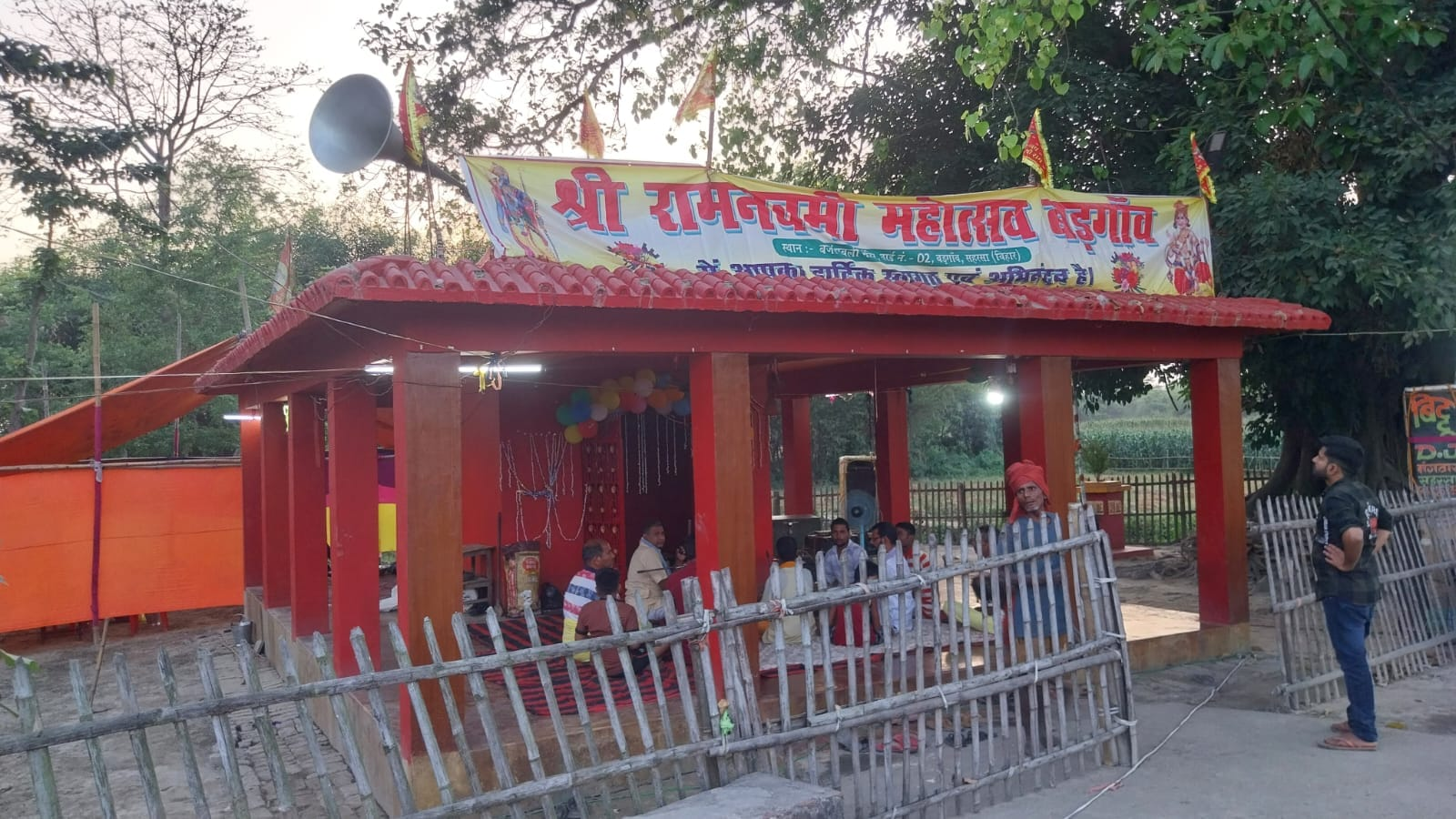
Bajrangbali temple
