= GaziPaita =

Gazipaita
- village
- Location in Bihar, India Gazipaita (India)
- Coordinates: 25.7231°N 86.7580°E
- Country: India
- State: Bihar
- Region: Mithila
- District: Saharsa district

Languages
  - Official: Maithili, Hindi
- Time zone: UTC+5:30 (IST)
- Postal code: 852217
- Nearest city: saharsa
- Literacy: 61.80%
- Website: saharsa.bih.nic.in

GaziPaita is a village in Sonbarsa Raj, Saharsa District, Bihar state. It belongs to Kosi Division.

== About ==
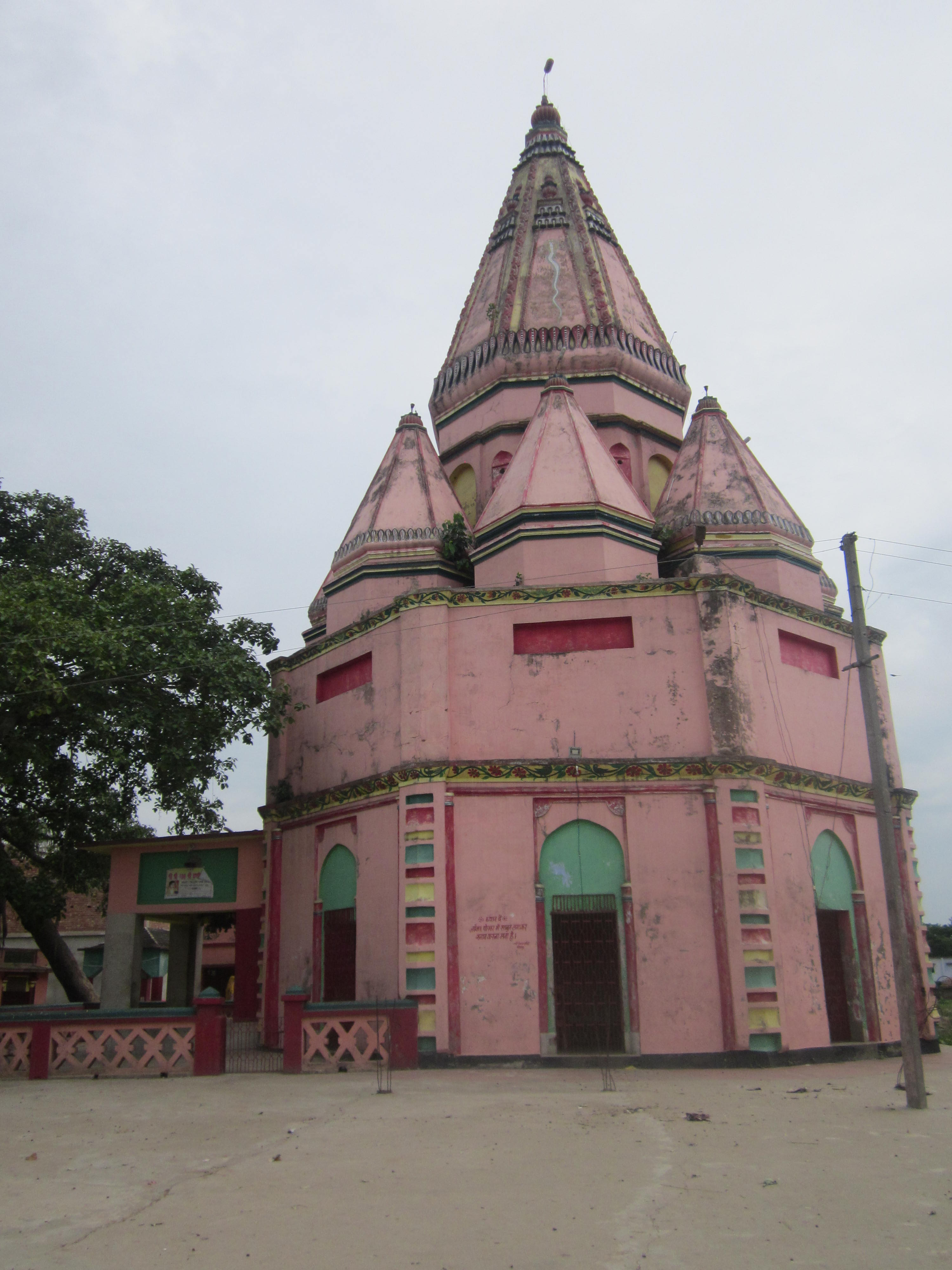

This village is full of sovereignty and similarity in which all cast live friendly. This village is dominated by Kanwar Rajput and there are a sumptuously temple of Maa Chandika which is best known as Chandi asthan Mandir. As per mythological tale this temple was built by King Virata (as per source) of the mahabharat age that's makes this village as religious place. It is one of the Shakta pithas places of worship consecrated to the goddess chandi

== Geography ==
Gazi Paita is located at Coordinates: [[25°43'37.0"N 86°45'08.8"E]] It has an average elevation of 42 meters. Gazi paita lies in North Bihar and is surrounded by Paita (Biratpur), Jamhara, Baisa, Atalkha, Bhada and Sahsaul.

== Demographics ==
Gazi Paita is a medium size village located in Sonbarsa of Saharsa district, Bihar with total 410 families residing. The Gazi Paita village has population of 1768 of which 950 are males while 818 are females as per Population Census 2011.

In Gazi Paita village population of children with age 0-6 is 363 which makes up 20.53% of total population of village. Average Sex Ratio of Gazi Paita village is 861 which is lower than Bihar state average of 918. Child Sex Ratio for the Gazi Paita as per census is 881, lower than Bihar average of 935.

Gazi Paita village has higher literacy rate compared to Bihar. In 2011, literacy rate of Gazi Paita village was 69.04% compared to 61.80% of Bihar. In Gazi Paita Male literacy stands at 82.96% while female literacy rate was 52.78%.

== Art and culture ==
Holi, DurgaPuja, Diwali and chhath are the main festival of gazipaita. Janmashtami, shivaratri, hanuman jayanti etc. are also celebrated with full zest and fervour. Sama Chakeva and Chaurchan are other festivals of this village. Every year, a grand Mela is organised on the occasion of durga puja in this village. Every Tuesday, lot of devotees of maa chandi comes for puja.

== Work ==
In Gazi Paita village out of total population, 554 were engaged in work activities. 64.98% of workers describe their work as Main Work (Employment or Earning more than 6 Months) while 35.02% were involved in Marginal activity providing livelihood for less than 6 months. Of 554 workers engaged in Main Work, 57 were cultivators (owner or co-owner) while 277 were Agricultural labourer.

== See also ==
- List of villages of Saharsa
