= Dhabouli =

Dhabouli may refer to:

- Dhabouli (Nepal), a village development committee in Dhanusa District, Janakpur Zone, Nepal
- Dhabouli, India, a village located in Bihar State
