= Bharauli, Saharsa =

Bharauli
- village
- Location in Bihar, India. Bharauli (India)
- Coordinates: 25.81207°N 86.57481°E
- Country: India
- State: Bihar
- District: Saharsa

Government
  - Type: Panchayati raj (India)
  - Body: Gram panchayat

Population (2011)
  - Total: 1,905

Languages
  - Official: Maithili, Hindi, English
- Time zone: UTC+5:30 (IST)

Bharauli is a village in Saharsa district, Bihar.
