= Majhaul =

In Bihar, India

- Village
- Mojuaul
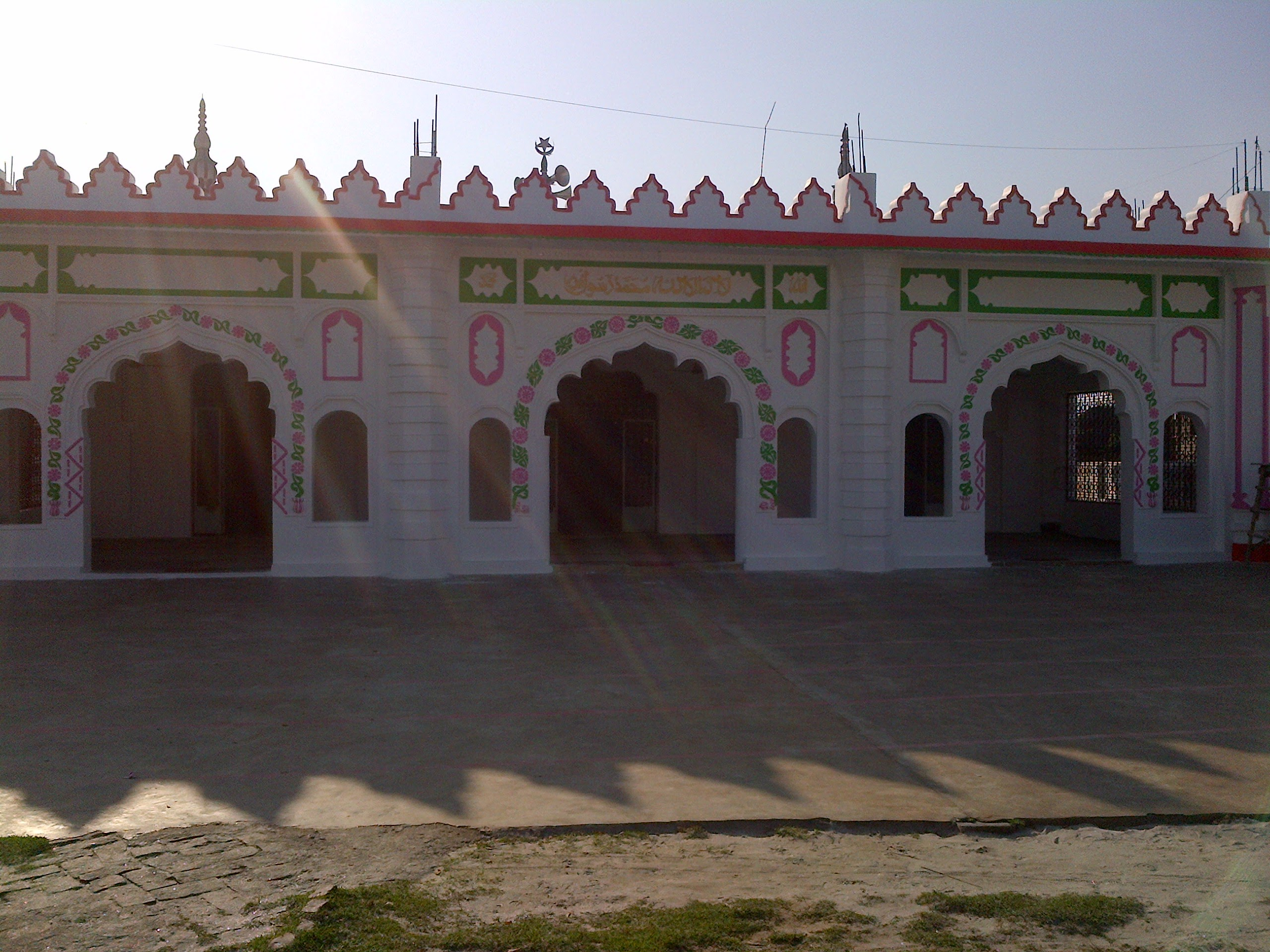
- Jama Masjid Majhaul

- Location in Bihar Majhaul (India)
- Coordinates: 25.987°N 86.465°E
- Country: India
- State: Bihar
- Division: Kosi
- District: Saharsa
- Block: Nauhatta
- Gram Panchayat: Shahpur

Area
  - Total: 105.75 ha (261.3 acres)
- Elevation: 46.976 m (154.12 ft)

Population (2011)
  - Total: 3,698
  - Density: 3,497/km^{2} (9,057/sq mi)
- Time zone: UTC+05:30 (IST)
- PIN: 852123
- Telephone code: 06478
- ISO 3166 code: IN-BR
- Vehicle registration: BR
- Sex ratio: 927 females per 1000 males ♂/♀
- Language: Urdu, Hindi
- Additional language: English

Majhaul (also known as Majhoul) is a large Village in Nauhatta Block in Saharsa District of Bihar State of India, with total 700-800 families residing. It belongs to Kosi Division.

It is 167 km from State capital Patna. It is contiguous with Kumhrauli to its north, Fequrahi to the south, Telwa to the east, Kosi River to the west. It comes under Shahpur-Majhaul Panchayat and Mahisi constituency. The Majhaul village has population of 3698 of which 1919 are males while 1779 are females as per Census 2011.

== Demographics ==
The village is spread over 700-800 acres. It divided into 6 wards (Ward number 9 to 14). Average Sex Ratio of Majhaul village is 927 which is higher than Bihar state average of 918. Child Sex Ratio for the Majhaul as per Census of India 2011 is 977, higher than Bihar average of 935. The population has decreased by -11.4% in last 10 years.

== Land, farming and agriculture ==
Majhaul is situated near the Kosi River at 300 meters east to the Eastern Kosi Embankment. This makes the land very fertile. The farmers in the village mostly cultivate Dhaan (paddy crop), Makai (Maize/Corn), Gahum (Wheat crop) and Moong (a type of lentil) in their farms. Since the climate of this region is most suitable for Dhaan (the paddy crop), Makai (Maize/Corn) a good crop brings happiness to many farmers in the village. Though, people do try to grow wheat crops, only few farmers get good yields. Most of the farmers have moderate harvest and hence it is not as popular as harvesting of Dhaan (the paddy crop), Makai (Maize/Corn. Instead, maize is the first best crop for the farmers of this village and Dhaan (the paddy crop) is the second. Therefore, they are tempted to grow garma dhaan and makai (maize) crops together apart from harvesting regular crops. The timing of Dhaan harvesting is especially notable as the villagers are happy in general for several reasons. The fresh crop of Dhaan and Makai (Maize/Corn) reaches every home, Whether you are owner of the land, or the farmer or just the harvester. The Dhaan is bound to come to every household. It can be cooked straight or flattened to make Chura which makes an amazing food when combined with fresh Sakkar (Jaggery) and "Dahi" (Curd). In the rainy season (Savan aur Bhado) the whole agriculture land of this village is covered by rain water, so in this season the main food of the villagers fish and some aqua fruits.

== Schools ==
- Urdu Middle School, Majhaul (10120103501)
- Urdu Girl's Primary School, Majhaul East (10120102502)
- Urdu Girl's Primary School, Majhaul West (10120103503)

== Transport ==
- By Rail

There is no railway station near to Majhaul in less than 20 km. Saharsa Junction railway station is the nearest railway station. However Darbhanga Junction railway station is a major railway station 67 km from Majhaul.

- By Road

Saharsa are the nearby towns to Majhaul having road connectivity by Bus.

== See also ==
- List of villages of Saharsa
- Saharsa District
- Nauhatta
