= Basauna =

Basauna Basouna Andoli
- village
- Nickname: Krishnatre
- Interactive map of Basauna
- Country: India
- State: Bihar
- Region: Mithila
- District: saharsa
- Named for: Pt.Bhagirath Jha (Andoli Bhusware)

Area
  - Total: 5,000 km^{2} (1,900 sq mi)

Population
  - Total: 8,000
  - Density: 1.6/km^{2} (4.1/sq mi)

Languages
  - Official: Maithili, Hindi
- Time zone: UTC+5:30 (IST)
- Nearest city: Saharsa
- Vidhan Sabha constituency: Saharsa
- Civic agency: Kahra Block

Basauna is a small countryside village in Saharsa district of Bihar, India. Kahra block of Saharsa district of Koshi Commissionary of Mithila region of Bihar, India. It is at a distance of 6 km from the district headquarters. Neighbouring villages are Dholi, Chainpur, Bharauli, Amarpur, Parminia, Siradeh, Dighia, Parari, and Bangaon. There are five schools: a high school, a girls' school, and three middle (which is a model High school of this region) and a girls\' school.Main temples are the Mahadev mandir, Thakur wari, Hanuman mandir, Kali mandir, Dharmraj, and Devi sthan (in Diwari). Agriculture is the main occupation of this village. Basauna village founder Shree Bhagirath Jha (Andoli Bhusware) was the First Person of this village Show Bansh Briksha. Bhagirath Chock Basauna is Modern Main Point Chock of Basauna. 1.Bhagirath Jha. 2.Narendra Dutt Jha.3.Hanuman Dutt Jha. 4.Babu Lal Jha. 5. Bhai Jee Jha. 6. Abadh Narayan Jha. 7.Shubh Narayan Jha (Lurai Jha) .8. Pramod Jha. 9.Anand Kumar Jha (Anant Jee.) Famous Advocate in this Region for Legal Help in all the Rular neighbouring Area.The main crops are rice, wheat, horse gram beans, and mung beans. Maithili songs (Bhagait – Local Geet) are popularly sung here. It is a village of secular character. The Hindu Muslim unity could be seen here at every steps. People has a great faith in Data \"Dharamraj\". Bhagait, a special type of songs. Famous village Festival is Ghari Maghee/Sawani, Mundan Sanskar is as per the local rule of Baba Dharamaj Ghabhar.
