= Laxminath Gosain (Babajee) =

Personal life
- Born: 1787 Parsarma, Bihar
- Died: 1872 (aged 84–85)

Religious life
- Religion: Hinduism

Paramhans Lakshminath Gosain (1787–1872) was an Indian yogi and poet from the Mithila region. He worshiped Parsarma, a village in the north Indian state of Bihar in the temple dedicated to him, as he was believed to possess divine qualities. On January,26th 2023, a movie about Paramhans was released in Bihar Bangaon.

== Life ==
=== Early life ===
Babajee was born as Lakshminath Jha in the nearby Parsarma village in 1787. His father's name was Shri Bachha Jha. He was born into a Maithil Brahmin family in a Kujilwar digaun mool and his gotra was Katyayan. Mool and Gotra are used to identify the roots of a family.

He learnt yoga and the Vedanta philosophy as a child. After early education in astrology under the tutelage of Shri Ratte Jha, Babajee returned to his native village where his family disapproved of his observed "aloofness" and pushed him to get married; he obeyed in order to do his dharma.

=== Training ===
After his marriage, he left for the forest to seek a guru. He traveled to a number of religious shrines in India and Nepal, eventually becoming a disciple of Guru Lambanathaswami of the Terai region, who was the disciple of Guru Gorakhnath. Under Guru Lambnath's tutelage, Babajee had the opportunity to meet Gorakhnath, who had become very old by that time.

=== Entry into Bangaon ===
After all the training of yoga and tantra, Babajee returned initially to Darbhanga. During one of his trips, nine years after he began his training, he happened to come to Bangaon, Bihar where he was warmly welcomed by the villagers both for being a yogi and his reputation as an able wrestler. In those days, wrestling used to be a sport of immense interest to the villagers. Given to the warm hospitality and goodness of the people, Babajee decided to stay in the village. Villagers made a kutiya (grass hut) for him. A villager named Kari Jha donated him a cow. He is said to have done many acts of goodwill to the people of the village.

=== Christian John ===
A British man named Christian John ("John Sahib"), who had been living in a nearby village called Bariyahi, which was controlled by the East India Company, came in contact with Babajee. Both of them shared common interest in religion. Christian John was influenced by Babajee's thinking and would come to emulate his writing style. John would later publish

== Written works ==
He composed several poems in Maithili and Hindi, devoted to the life of Radha, Krishna and Shiva. Christian John published his composed hymns.

Babjee wrote a huge collection of Bhajans which were published as a collection named Bhajnawali. Bhajnawali was kept in its original form by Late Mahavir Jha. It was later organized by Pandit Chhedi Jha Dwijwar. Bhajnawali has Bhajans that cover a wide range of topics describing the childhood of the Lord Rama, Lord Krishna and the philosophical ones as well.

His only other published work is Vivek Ratnawali.

Some of his famous bhajans included the following.

Man re kahan firat baurana ("mind" where are you wandering).

"mind" is used as a metaphor for oneself in this Bhajan.

मन रे कहाँ फिरत बौराना
अबहूँ सीख सिखावन मेरो, चोला भयो है पुराना
मानुष जनम पदारथ पाए, भजत ना क्यों भगवाना
अंत काल पामर पछ्तैहें, यमपुर जबहीं ठिकाना
कियो करार भजन करिबे को, सो बात भूलना
केश सफ़ेद भयो सब तेरो, पहुंचा यम परवाना
नारी नेह देह से छाड़ो, नैनन जोती झपलाना
कुल परिवार बात नहीं पूछत कहत बात कटूलाना
बहुत कमाई असोच भये है, ले ले धरात खजाना
‘लक्ष्मीपति’ नर राम भजन बिनु, माटी मोल बिकाना

Ambe aab uchit nahi deri

(Mother Goddess! Its already too late)

अम्बे आब उचित नहीं देरी
मित्र बंधू सब टक-टक ताकय, नहीं सहाय अहि बेरी
योग यज्ञ जप कय नहीं सकलों, परलहूं कालक फेरी
केवल द्वन्द फंद मै फैस कय, पाप बटोरल ढेरी
नाम उचारब दुस्तर भय गेल, कंठ लेल कफ घेरी
एक उपाय सुझे ऐछ अम्बे, आहाँ नयन भैर हेरी
शुध्ह भजन तुए हे जगदम्बे, देब बजाबथि भेड़ी
‘लक्ष्मीपति ‘ करुणामयी अम्बे, बिसरहूँ चूक घनेरी.

== Babaji Samaroh ==
Babaji Samaroh(Get together) is held every year on 5 December, Babaji's birthday, on the premises of Babaji Temple. It was started in 1972 by Bhavesh Mishra. The function continued to be organized by Bhavesh Mishra, a popular journalist and lawyer of the district, until his sudden demise in 1991. His family members, with the help of fellow villagers, have been organizing this function since then.

Apart from the special worship, there are many other cultural programs held during the Samaroh.

The function usually starts with the inauguration by a top official (DM/SP) or some political leader of the district. This is followed by lectures by some respected villagers, as well as musical programs and Haasya Kavi Sammelans(Gathering of Poets). For a long time, locally renowned poet Amiya Halaahal, singers Hemkant Jha, Mahendra and the singer-lyricist duo Nand-Naval used to be top attractions of the function.

== In popular culture ==
A commemorative audio cassette of Babajee's Bhajans was released by Bhavesh Mishra in the 1980s.
