= Satar Kataiya =

Tehsil of Saharsa District in Bihar, India

- Tehsil
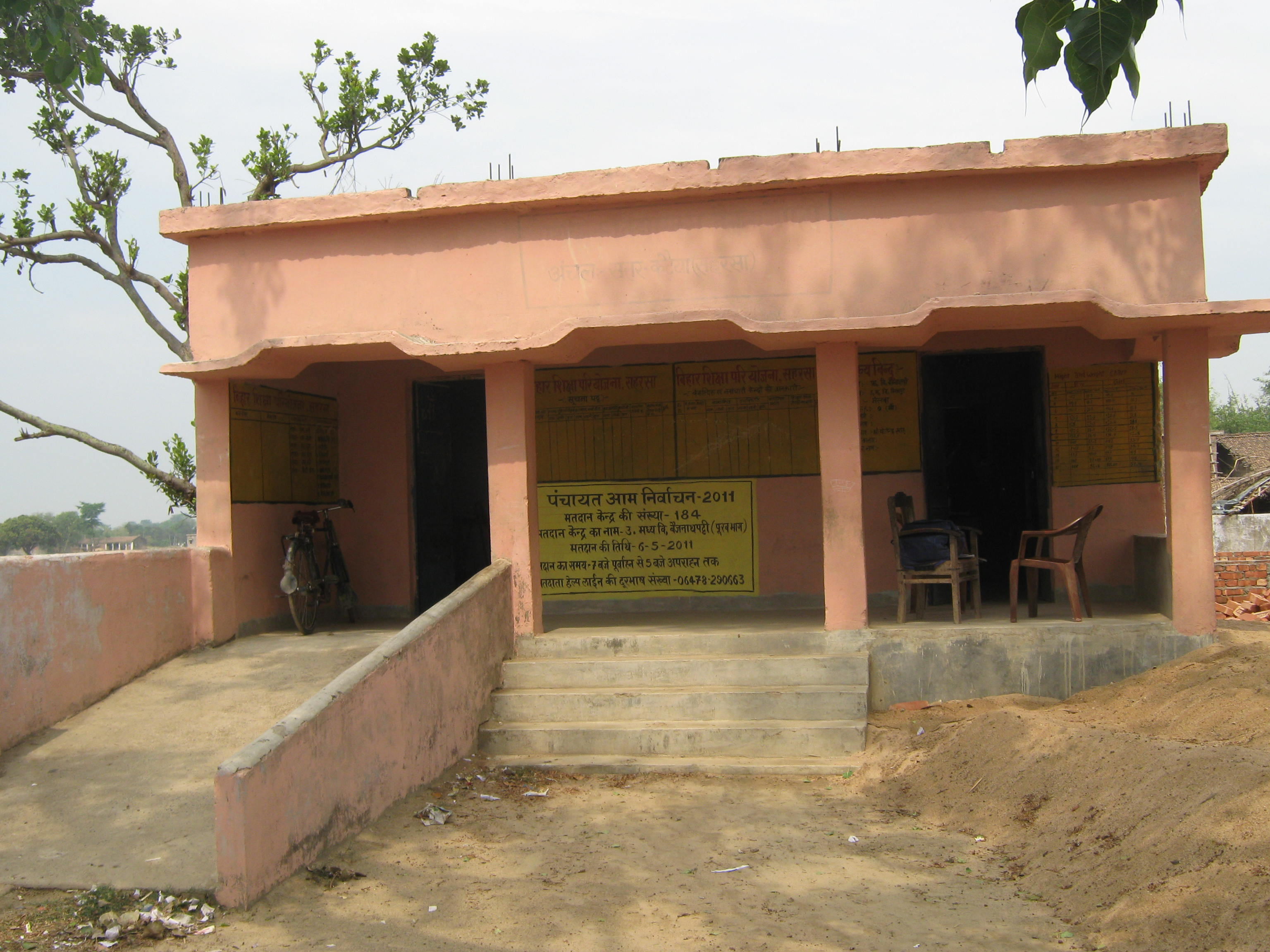
- Village of Hasa Hakpur within the Tehsil

- Location within Bihar Location within India
- Coordinates: 25°56′57″N 86°34′41″E
- Country: India
- State: Bihar
- Region: Mithila
- District: Saharsa
- Villages: 38

Area
  - Total: 160 km^{2} (62 sq mi)
- Elevation: 45 m (148 ft)

Population (2011)
  - Total: 151,060
  - Density: 940/km^{2} (2,400/sq mi)
- Time zone: UTC+5:30 (IST)
- PIN: 852124

Satar Kataiya (or Sattar Kataiya) is a block in Saharsa District, Bihar, India. Its seat of government is located in the village of Sattar. As of the year 2011, its population is 151,060.

== Geography ==
Satar Kataiya is located on the east of the Kosi River, approximately 8 kilometres north of its district capital Saharsa. Its average elevation is at 45 metres above the sea level.

== Administrative divisions ==
As of 2011, there are a total of 38 villages within the boundary of Satar Kataiya. They are listed as follows:

- Agwanpur
- Aran
- Baghi urf Bhaluasukhasan
- Baijnathpur
- Bara
- Barahser
- Bela
- Bijalpur
- Bishunpur
- Chauri Bijalpur
- Chinwari
- Dahaha Badh
- Gandaul
- Gangaura Behra
- Gobargarha urf jarsain
- Hasa Hakpur
- Itahri
- Kharik Badh
- Lachhminia
- Laukahi
- Makuna
- Matiari Badh
- Nandlali
- Pachgachhia
- Padumpur
- Panidaha
- Patori
- Pipra
- Purikh
- Rakeapatti
- Rohua Arazi
- Sadhua Badh
- Sattar
- Shahpur
- Sihaul
- Sisai
- Tuniahi
- Ukahi

== Demographics ==
Religion in Satar Kataiya
Religion	Percent
Hinduism	90.89%
Islam	8.98%
Christianity	0.04%
other	0.09%

In 2011, there are 28,710 households within Satar Kataiya, with a total population of 151,060. Out of the total population, 79,332 are male and 71,728 are female. The total literacy rate is 52.36%, with 51.2% of the male residents and 32.26% of the female population being literate.

== See also ==
- Saharsa district
