= Dhabouli, Saharsa =

Dhabouli
- Interactive map of Dhabouli
- Coordinates: 25°39′6.9″N 85°19′58.44″E
- Country: India
- State: Bihar
- District: Saharsa

Area
  - Total: 2,556 ha (6,320 acres)

Population
  - Total: 25,000

Dhabouli is a village located in Saharsa district of the Indian state of Bihar.

== Geography ==
The village covers 2,556 hectares. Madhepura Is nearest town to Dhabauli which is approximately 10 km away.

== Economy ==
The primary occupation Is farming, but many residents migrated to places like Delhi and Mumbai for work. A number of people work in state and central governments and the private sector. The village has good telecom connectivity. The village has also a branch of State Bank of India.

== Demographics ==
More than 25,000 people have been living here since the origin of this area. The village has three panchayats.

== Administration ==
The three panchayats in Dhabouli are:

- Dhabouli (South)
- Dhabouli (East)
- Dhabouli (West) Mauni Gram Kahra is also a part of this Panchayat.

This village comes under the Patarghat Block and OP. It comes under Sourbajar sub-division and [Saharsa] District. It comes under [Sonbarsha, Saharsa in Bihar (Vidhan Sabha constituency)].

== Education ==
A +2 level Senior Secondary School, seven Middle Schools and four Primary Schools are present.

== Transportation ==
Dhabouli has connectivity by road and rail transport from Madhepura and Saharsa.

Type	Status
Private Bus Service	Available within village
Railway Station	Nearest railway station Madhepura
