= Saur Bazar =

Block in Bihar

- Block
- Location within Bihar Location within India
- Coordinates: 25.8352°N 86.6838°E
- Country: India
- State: Bihar
- District: Saharsa

Population
  - Total: 214,166
- Time zone: UTC+5:30 (IST)

Saur Bazar is a block in the Saharsa district of Bihar, India. It is situated at Latitude 25.8352°N and longitude 86.6838°E. The block is an important administrative unit within the district and is characterized by its rural nature, with a large number of villages and 17 Panchayats.

== Villages ==
#	Villages	Administrative Division	Population
1	Ajgaiba	Saur Bazar	1,885
2	Baijnathpur	Saur Bazar	5,148
3	Baijnathpur	Saur Bazar	4,13 8
4	Bakhri	Saur Bazar	5,590
5	Bancholha	Saur Bazar	1,549
6	Bansi Rauta	Saur Bazar	2,281
7	Barahi	Saur Bazar	2,982
8	Barsam	Saur Bazar	2,524
9	Barsamkhopatti	Saur Bazar	1,520
10	Bhabtia	Saur Bazar	5,893
11	Bhada	Saur Bazar	1,725
12	Bhagwanpur	Saur Bazar	562
13	Bhagwanpur	Saur Bazar	477
14	Bhawanipur	Saur Bazar	1,441
15	Bhulia	Saur Bazar	489
16	Bhulia	Saur Bazar	245
17	Chakla	Saur Bazar	606
18	Chanaur	Saur Bazar	22,436
19	Chikni Dakhinwari	Saur Bazar	804
20	Chikni Darmeani	Saur Bazar	1,302
21	Chikni Uttarwari	Saur Bazar	949
22	Dham sena	Saur Bazar	2,085
23	Dham sena	Saur Bazar	2,592
24	Gamharia	Saur Bazar	11,609
25	Garhia	Saur Bazar	1,487
26	Hanuman Nagar Chakla	Saur Bazar	1,415
27	Indarwa	Saur Bazar	2,338
28	Jiwachhpur Pachhiari Patti	Saur Bazar	482
29	Jiwachhpur Purwari	Saur Bazar	674
30	Kabela	Saur Bazar	1,666
31	Kabela Chak	Saur Bazar	1,594
32	Kachra	Saur Bazar	2,928
33	Kachra	Saur Bazar	3,575
34	Kachradaun	Saur Bazar	619
35	Kachradaun	Saur Bazar	1,270
36	Kanp	Saur Bazar	19,431
37	Karahia	Saur Bazar	4,664
38	Khajuri	Saur Bazar	11,177
39	Lachhminia	Saur Bazar	3,987
40	Madhura	Saur Bazar	6,012
41	Nado	Saur Bazar	8,084
42	Phursaha	Saur Bazar	3,317
43	Raghunathpur	Saur Bazar	1,162
44	Raghunathpur	Saur Bazar	1,322
45	Rampur	Saur Bazar	4,168
46	Rauta Khem	Saur Bazar	3,975
47	Rohua	Saur Bazar	908
48	Rohua	Saur Bazar	116
49	Sahuria	Saur Bazar	10,934
50	Sahuria	Saur Bazar	2,932
51	Saur	Saur Bazar	4,220
52	Saur Bazar	Saur Bazar	4,577
53	Silet	Saur Bazar	6,940
54	Suhath	Saur Bazar	7,965
55	Tiri	Saur Bazar	9,395
