= Lagma =

Lagma Apna Lagma
- Village
- Nickname: Lgm
- Location in Bihar, India Lagma (India)
- Coordinates: 25.75°N 86.67°E
- Country: India
- State: Bihar
- Region: Mithila
- District: Samastipur District
- Founder: Sadakar Jha

Government
  - Type: Panchayat

Languages
- Time zone: UTC+5:30 (IST)
- ISO 3166 code: IN-BR
- Website: samastipur.bih.nic.in

Lagma is a village in the northern Indian state of Bihar

== Geography ==
Lagma is located on the bank of the Kosi River. It is surrounded by the river on three sides. Highway NH-107 passes through the village. It is about 25 kilometers from Saharsa district and 7 kilometers from Sonbarsa Block. There are three schools in this village, one primary school, one middle school and One high school near NH-107.
