= Sonbarsa Raj =

Zamindari estate

- 1660–1949
- Capital: Sonbarsa
- Common languages: Maithili, Hindi
- Raja
  - 1660: Raja Ranjit Singh (first)
  - 1949: Rao Bahadur Rudra Pratap Singh (last)
- History
  - Established: 1660
  - Acceded to India: 1949
- Currency: Indian Rupee
Succeeded by
Dominion of India
- Today part of: Bihar, Republic of India

The Sonbarsa Raj was a medieval chieftaincy and later a zamindari (estate) during British Raj in modern-day Bihar, in erstwhile Bhagalpur district (now in Saharsa). It was controlled by the Gandhavariya Rajputs.

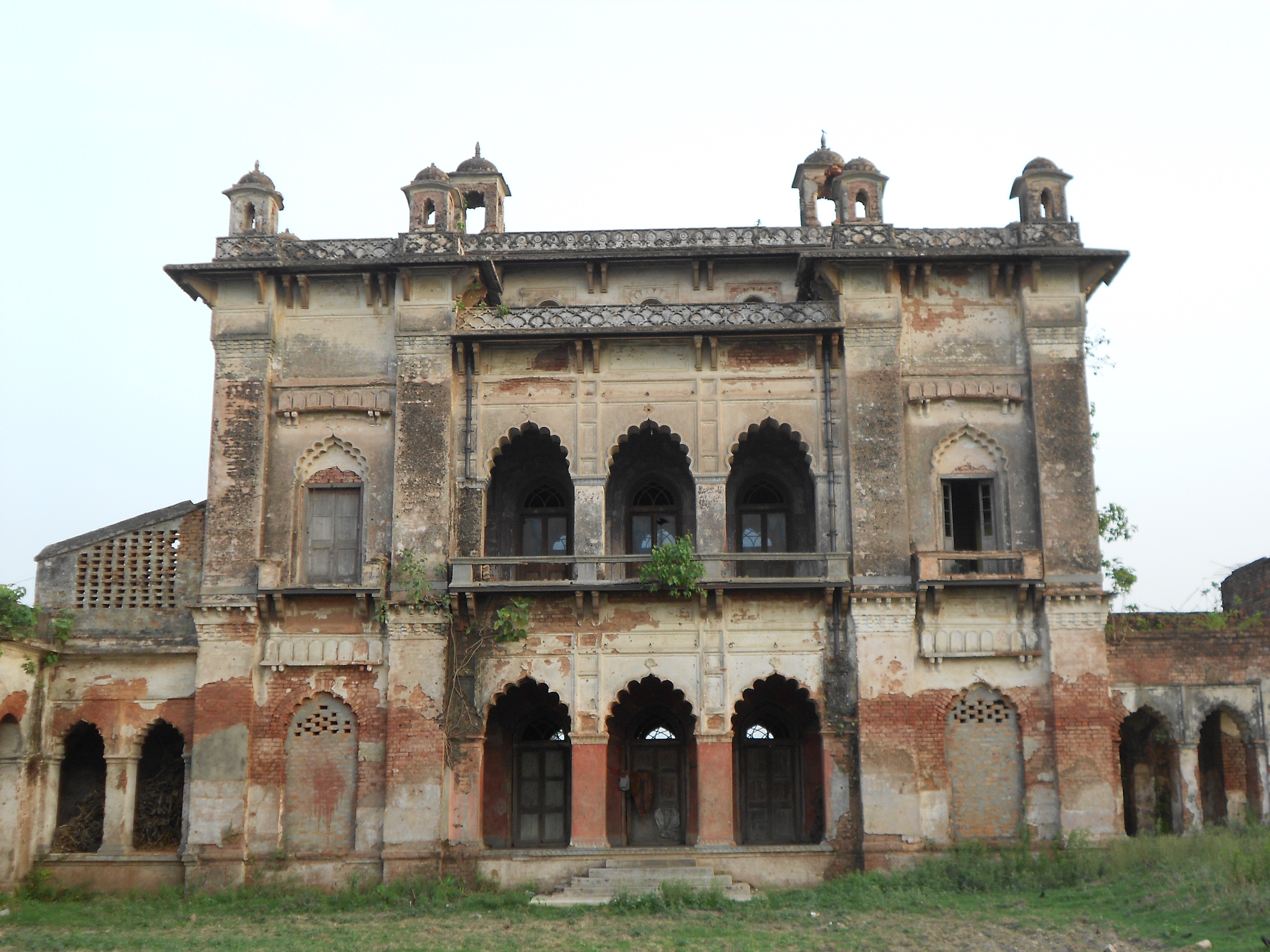
The Palace of Sonbarsa Raj

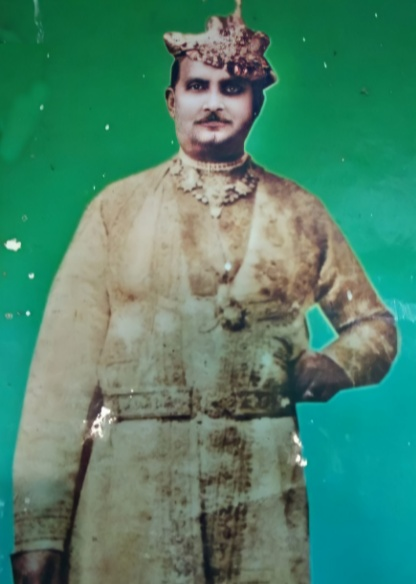
Raja Harivallabh Narayan Singh of Sonbarsa Raj

The grants and sanad shows that Gandhavariyas were important Rajas under the Mughals in sarkar Tirhut. Beside Sonbarsa, the Gandhavarias landlords were found in Baruari, Parsarma, Barail, Sokhpur, Jadia, Basantpur, Durgapur, Sukhsena, Bhatattan, Panchgachhia etc.

The Zamindari estate of Mangwar established by Babu Bhagwan Singh also belongs to the Gandhavaria clan, whose descendants Babu Sagar Prasad Singh lives there.

== History ==
Sonbarsa Raj was founded by Raja Ranjit Singh in the present district of Saharsa. It became a powerful and large estate in the region. The Sonbarsa Raj family traces its origin from Raja Vikramaditya of Ujjain and belongs to the Agni branch of Kshatriya.

The Sonbarsa raj originated in 1654, when the Mughal emperor Aurangzeb granted the title of raja, along with a zamindari estate based at Narsinghpur, to Raja Kesri Singh. A later descendant, Amar Singh, built a fort at Sihaul.

The grant and sanad related to Sonbarsa Raj shows that Gandhavarias were important Rajas under the Mughal and were loyal to the ruling dynasty. They therefore played an important role in the politics of the time in the region of Sarkar Tirhut of Mithila.

One of the famous zamindars of Sonbarsa was Raja Harivallabh Narayan Singh, who was honoured by King George V at the imperial Delhi durbar held in 1911 and was provided with a royal chair along with the other royalty of India. The present palace at Sonbarsa was built during his tenure.

== See also ==
- Zamindars of Bihar
