= Saharsa =

City and municipal corporation in Bihar, India

- City
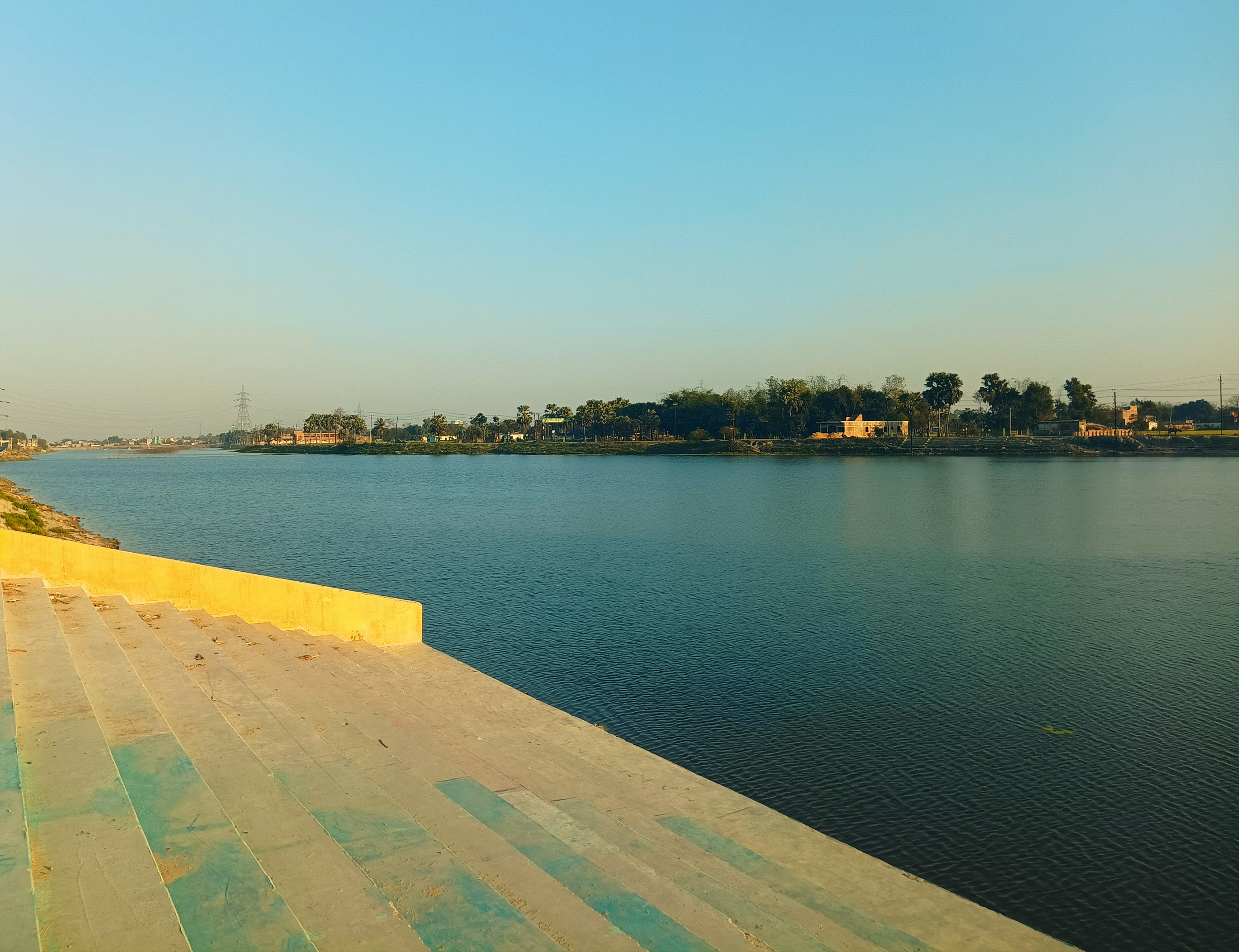
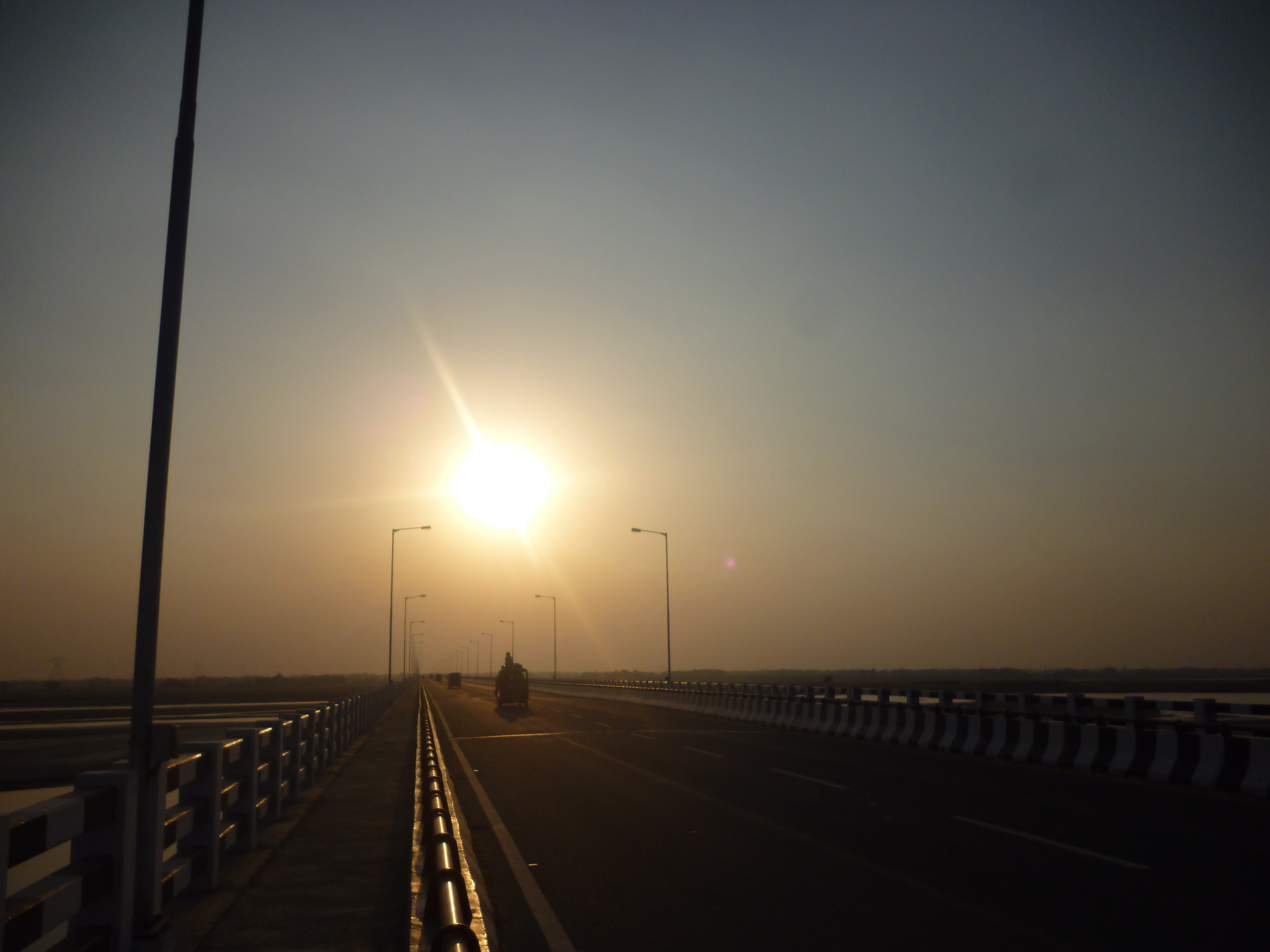
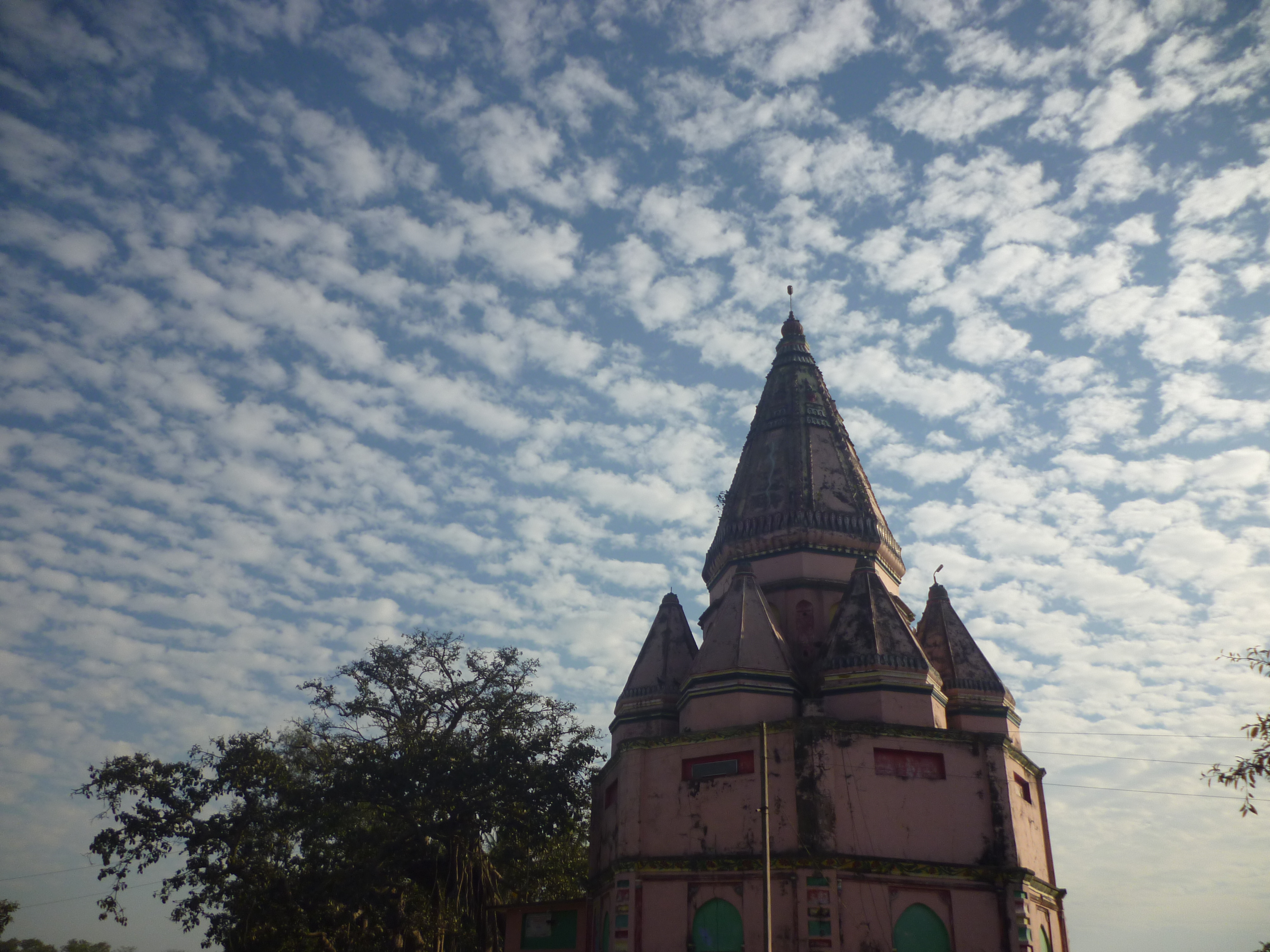
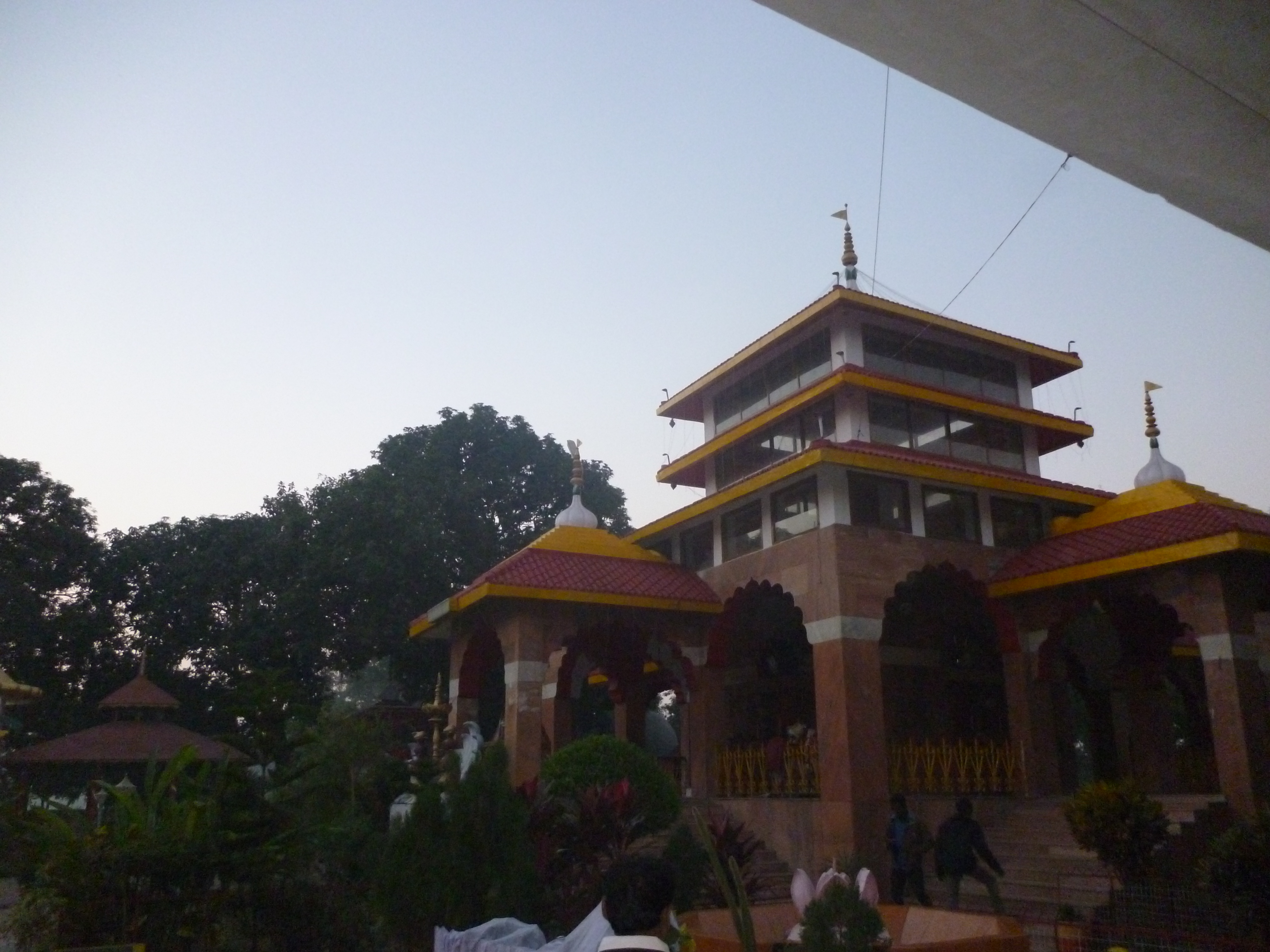
- Matsyaganda Lake Kosi Bridge Baluwaha, Saharsa Chandika Sthan Temple Saharsa Matsyagandha Temple

- Location in Bihar, India
- Coordinates: 25.88°N 86.6°E
- Country: India
- State: Bihar
- Region: Mithila
- District: Saharsa
- Established: 1954

Government
  - Type: Municipal corporation
  - Body: Saharsa Municipal Corporation
  - Member of the Legislative Assembly: I.P Gupta (IIP)

Area
  - Total: 45 km^{2} (17 sq mi)
  - Rank: 2nd in Bihar
- Elevation: 41 m (135 ft)

Population (2011)
  - Total: 156,540
  - Rank: 15th in Bihar
  - Density: 3,500/km^{2} (9,000/sq mi)

Languages
  - Official: Hindi
  - Additional official: Urdu
  - Regional: Maithili
- Time zone: UTC+5:30 (IST)
- PIN: 852201-852154-852221-852127 (Saharsa)
- Telephone code: 916478
- ISO 3166 code: IN-BR
- Vehicle registration: BR-19
- Sex ratio: 933 females per 1000 males ♂/♀
- Vidhan Sabha constituency: Saharsa
- Website: saharsa.bih.nic.in

Saharsa is a city and municipal corporation in the Saharsa District in the eastern part of the state of Bihar, India. It is situated near the eastern banks of the Kosi River. It serves as the administrative headquarters for the Saharsa District and is also the Divisional headquarters of the Kosi Division.

The regional language of the city is Maithili. Alongside Maithili, Hindi is widely understood and spoken.

== History ==
Saharsa is part of the Mithila region, which first gained prominence after settlement by Indo-Aryan tribes that established the Mithila Kingdom (also known as the Kingdom of the Videhas). During the late Vedic period (c. 1100–500 BCE), Videhas developed as one of the major political and cultural centres of South Asia, along with Kuru and Pañcāla. The kings of the Videhas Kingdom were referred to as Janakas.

The Videha Kingdom was later incorporated into the Vajjika League, which had its capital in the city of Vaishali, which is also located in Mithila.

== Economy ==
=== Agriculture ===
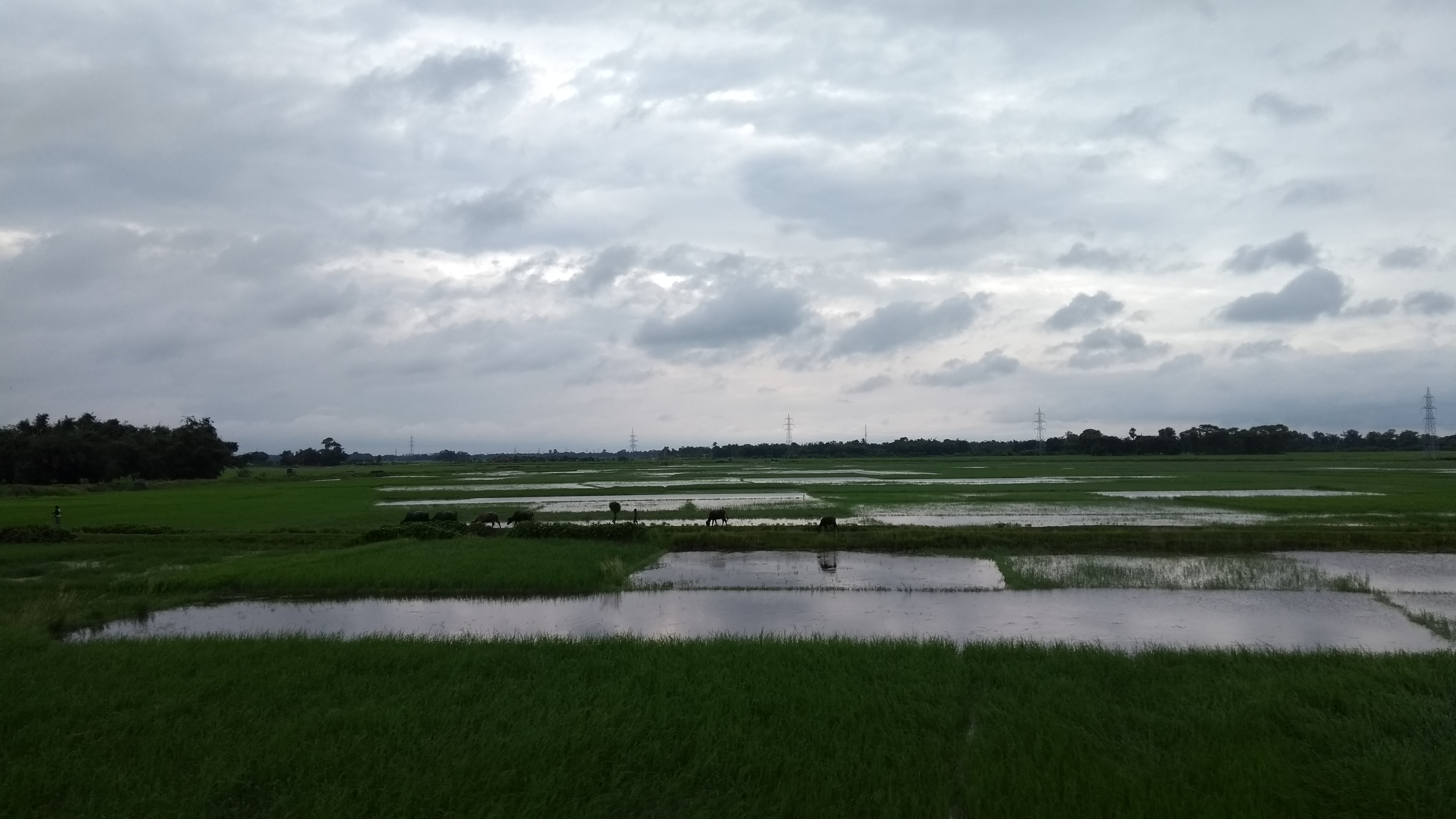
Paddy Plantations near Saharsa city, Koshi Anchal, Bihar region

It is a major producer of corn and makhana in India. From Saharsa, corn and Makhana are exported to America, Australia, France, Japan, and England. Every year, 2 lakh metric tons of corn are exported to different countries, and similarly, to Makhana. Rice, mangoes, litchi, bamboo, mustard, corn, wheat, and sugarcane.

== Transport ==
Darbhanga Airport is the nearest operational airport roughly 97 km away via road. SpiceJet and IndiGo operate flights to cities including Bangalore, Mumbai, Delhi, Kolkata, Hyderabad, and Ahmedabad. One can reach Saharsa by rail and by road from New Delhi, Patna, and Mumbai.

Saharsa Junction is a railway station under the East Central Railway. Saharsa Junction covers up to Purnia Junction, Forbesganj Station, and Khagaria Junction. It is an A-category railway station under the Samastipur railway division. The railway junction has been certified as ISO 14001:2015 for environmental management. Saharsa Junction is one of the top 50 rail ticket booking stations in India and one of the top 3 rail ticket booking stations in ECR. In early 2005, a broad gauge line connected it to Khagaria on the New Delhi-Guwahati main line. Earlier, there was only a meter-gauge line on the Khagaria – Mansi – Forbesganj section of the East Central Railway. Saharsa is directly connected to New Delhi, Sealdah, Kolkata, Amritsar, Bandra the Ranchi via Train.

Highways including NH107, NH327E, and NH527E help connect the city to other parts of India.

== Geography ==
Saharsa is located at 25.88°N 86.6°E. It has an average elevation of 41 metres (134 feet). Saharsa and its surrounding areas occupy a flat alluvial plain forming part of the Kosi river basin. The city lies in the Kosi alluvial megafan, one of the largest alluvial fans in the world. The land is very fertile but frequent changes in the course of the Kosi, one of the largest tributaries of the Ganges, have led to the problems associated with soil erosion. Flooding is a major reason for the poor connectivity of the area; bridges are often washed away. Major flooding occurs almost annually, causing a significant loss of life and property.

=== Rivers ===
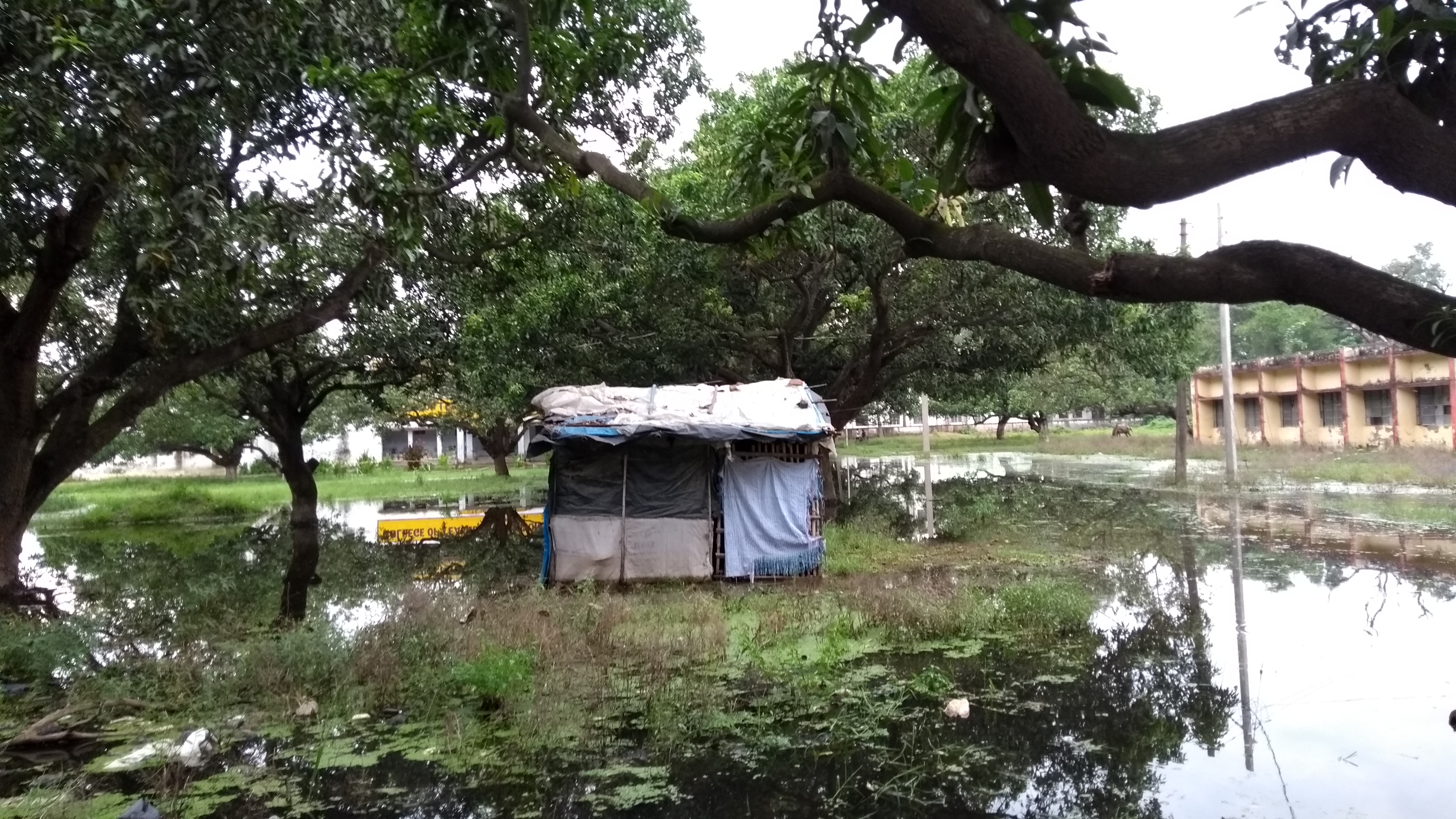
Flooding is a common occurrence in the city

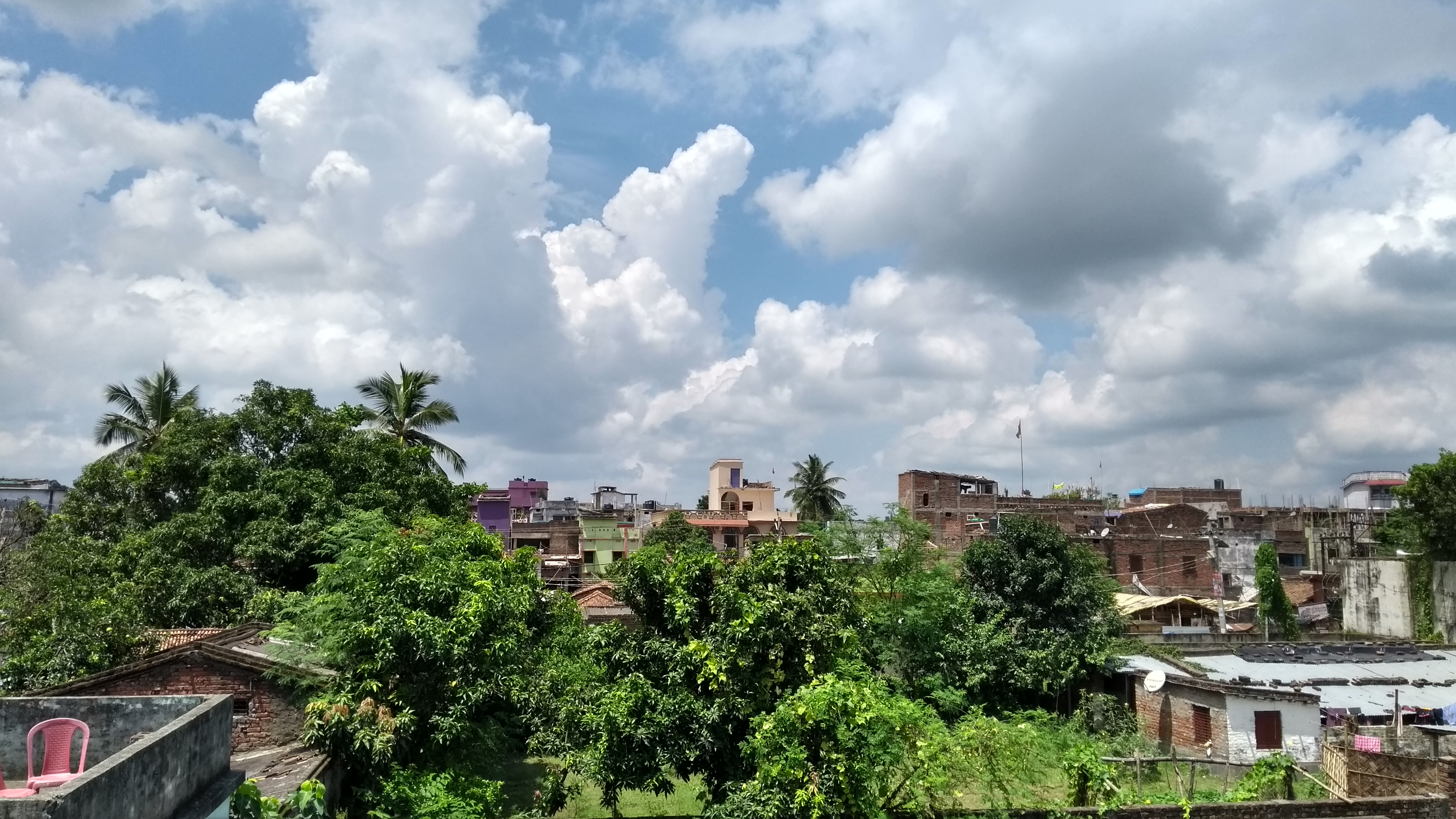
Rajwanshi Nagar, Koshi Chowk, Saharsa (Koshi Division), Bihar

The Koshi River and its tributaries flood annually, affecting about 21,000 km^{2} (8,100 sq mi) of fertile agricultural lands and affecting the rural economy. This is the most devastating river in Bihar, earning it the epithet "Sorrow of Bihar".

=== Demographics ===
In 2011, Saharsa had a population of 1,897,102, of which 995,502 and 901,600 were male and female, respectively. There was a change of 25.79 percent in the population compared to the population as of 2001. In the previous census of India in 2001, Saharsa District recorded an increase of 33.03 percent in its population compared to 1991.

The initial provisional data suggest a density of 1,125 in 2011 compared to 895 in 2001. The total area under the Saharsa district is about 1,686 square kilometres (651 sq mi).

The average literacy rate of Saharsa in 2011 was 54.57, compared to 39.08 of 2001. Male and female literacy were 65.22 and 42.73, respectively. For the 2001 census, the same figures stood at 51.66 and 25.27 in Saharsa District. The total number of literates in Saharsa District was 829,206, with 521,560 males and 307,646 females. In 2001, Saharsa District had 465,577 in its total region.

The sex ratio in Saharsa stood at 906 females per 1000 males compared to the 2001 census figure of 910. The average national sex ratio in India is 940 as per the latest reports of the Census 2011 Directorate.

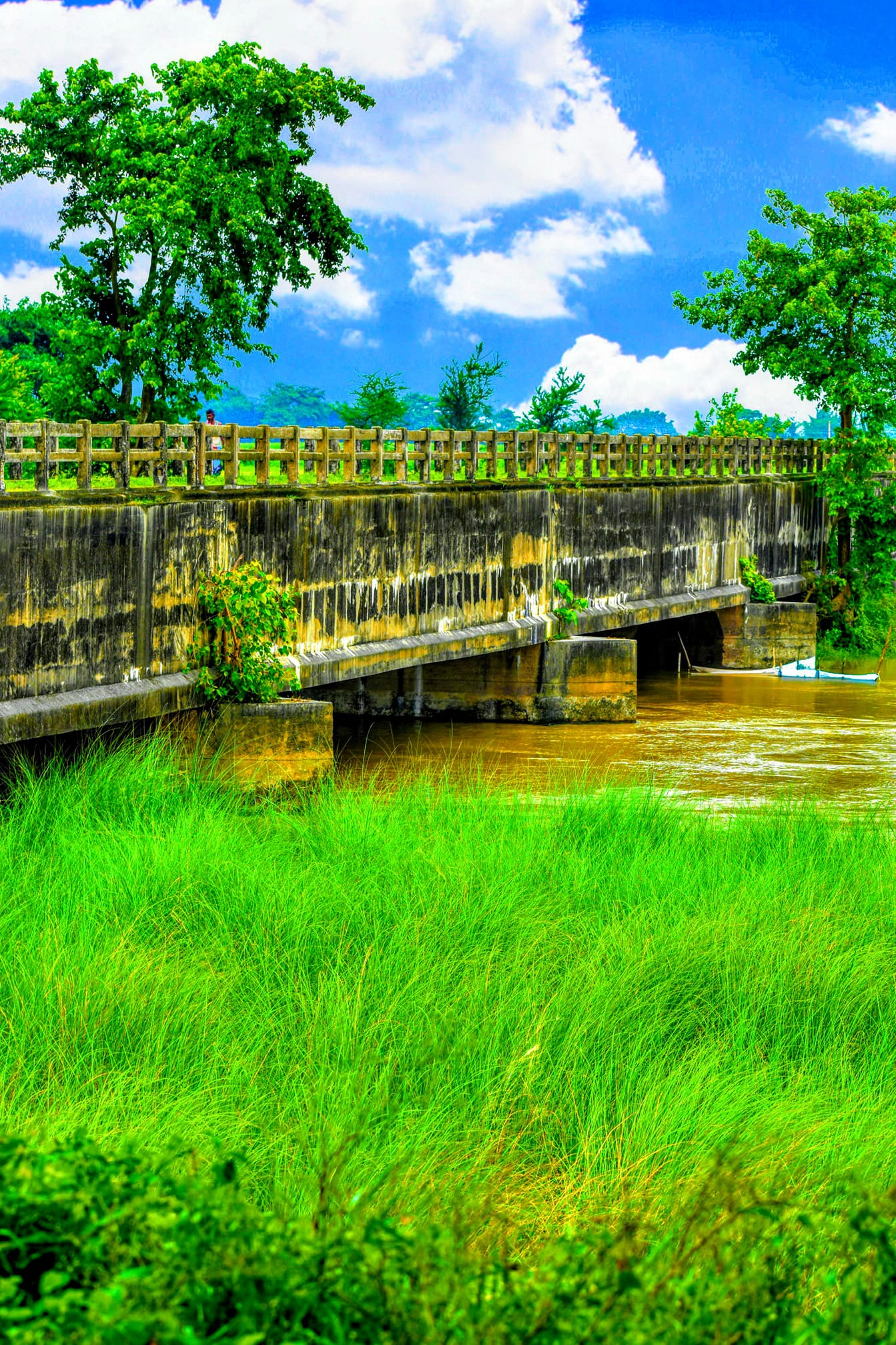
The Siphon Bridge at Bargaon is a historic engineering structure that carries a large canal across the Kosi River in Saharsa district, Bihar, India. Built during the British period in 1937, the bridge is an important example of early hydraulic engineering and water-management infrastructure in the Kosi region. It is one of the notable historical landmarks of Bargaon and reflects the engineering techniques used for canal irrigation and water transportation during the colonial era.

== Educational institutes ==
=== Government College ===
- Saharsa College of Engineering
- MLT College, Saharsa
- Government Polytechnic College, Saharsa
- RM College, Saharsa
- S.N.S.R.K.S College, Saharsa
- Ramesh Jha Mahila College, Saharsa
- Mandan Bharti Agricultural College, Saharsa

=== Private College ===
- Lord Buddha Koshi Medical College and Hospital
- Shree Narayan Medical Institute and Hospital
- Evening college, Saharsa
- Premlata Amrendra Mishra College, Saharsa

== Notable people ==
- Maṇḍana Miśra
- Bindheshwari Prasad Mandal, former Chief Minister of Bihar
- Tarkishore Prasad, Deputy Chief Minister of Bihar
- Baldev Mishra writer
- Jamshedpur Gopeshwar, politician
- Ulka Gupta, actress
- Mehboob Ali Kaiser, politician
- Rajkamal Choudhary writer
- Girija Prasad Koirala, politician and former Prime Minister of Nepal, born in Saharsa

== See also ==
- List of cities in Bihar
- Majhaul
- Nauhatta
- Shankarpur
- Chainpur
