= Saharsa district =

District in Bihar, India

Coordinates: 25°53′N 86°36′E

- District of Bihar
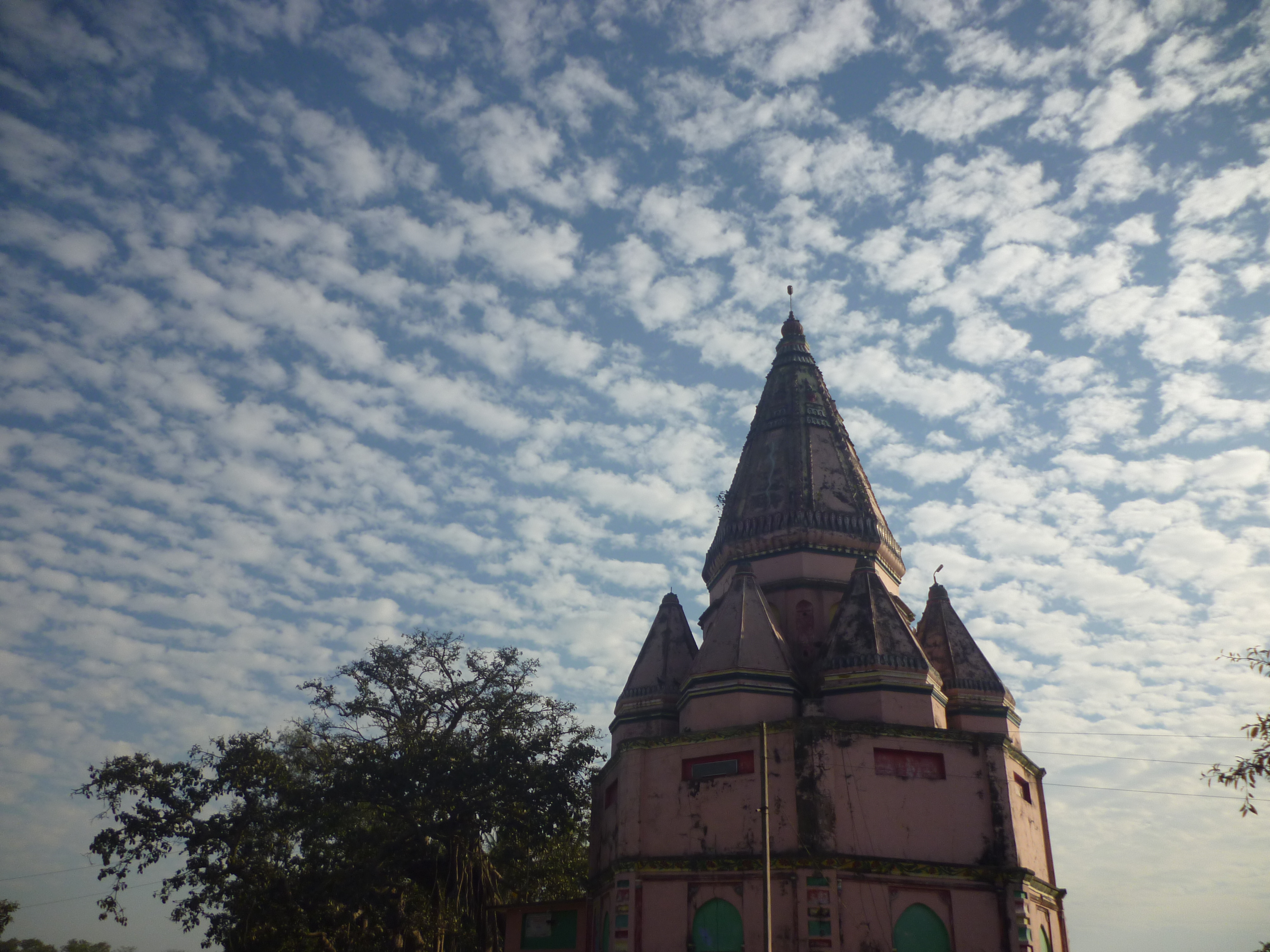
- Chandika Sthan Temple near Saharsa

- Location of Saharsa district in Bihar
- Country: India
- State: Bihar
- Region: Mithila
- Division: Kosi
- Established: 1 April 1954
- Headquarters: Saharsa

Government
  - Lok Sabha constituencies: Madhepura
  - Vidhan Sabha constituencies: Sonbarsha, Saharsa, Simri Bakhtiarpur, Mahishi

Area
  - Total: 1,702 km^{2} (657 sq mi)

Population (2011)
  - Total: 1,900,661
  - Density: 1,117/km^{2} (2,892/sq mi)

Demographics
  - Literacy: 54.57 per cent
  - Sex ratio: 906
- Time zone: UTC+05:30 (IST)
- Major highways: NH 231 and NH 327
- Website: saharsa.nic.in

The Saharsa district is one of the thirty-eight districts of Bihar, India. Saharsa city is the administrative headquarters of this district. The Saharsa district is a part of the Kosi Division and it became a district on 1 April 1954 and has subsequently become smaller with other districts being carved from it, most notably Madhepura in 1981.

Saharsa is located in the Mithila region, one of the earliest centers of Brahminical civilization in India. Saharsa is considered as the heart of whole Mithila region. it is the place which gave birth to legends such as like Mandana Misra, Laxminath Gosain, Ubhai Bharti, etc.

== History ==
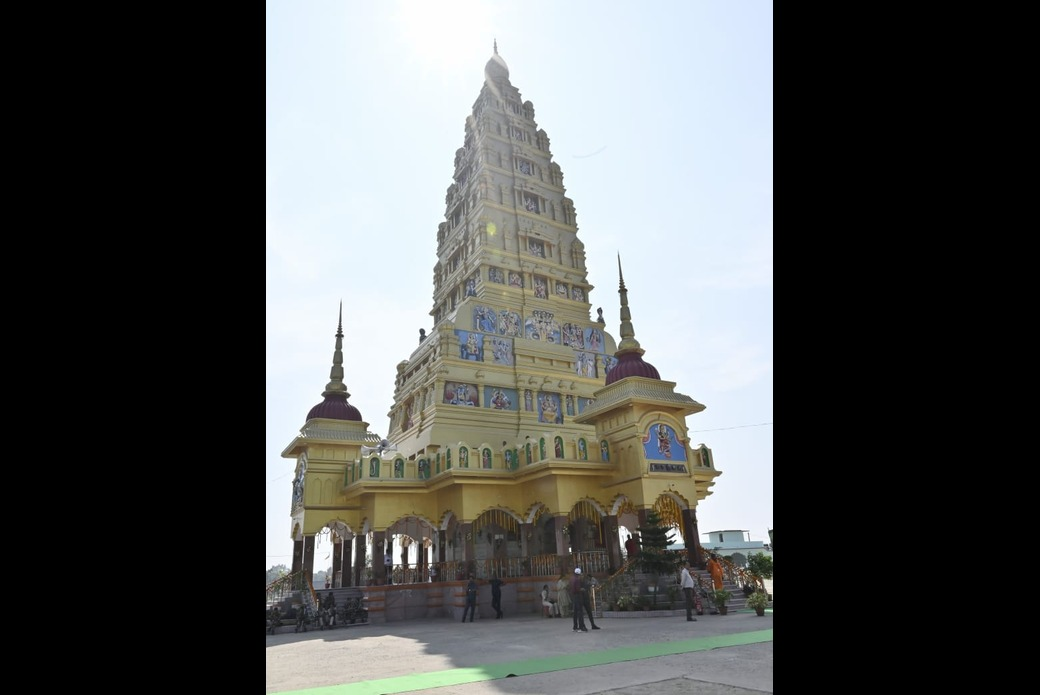
Ancient Vishhara Temple located in Saharasa district.

Saharsa is part of the Mithila region. Mithila first gained prominence after being settled by Indo-Aryan peoples who established the Mithila Kingdom (also called Kingdom of the Videhas). During the late Vedic period (c. 1100–500 BCE), Videha became one of the major political and cultural centers of South Asia, along with Kuru and Pañcāla. The kings of the Videha Kingdom were called Janakas. The Videha Kingdom was later incorporated into the Vajjika League, which had its capital in the city of Vaishali, which is also in Mithila.

Mandan Mishra whose conversation with the Shankaracharya was considered one of the most intellectual conversations in the world was done in Mahismati village, nowadays Mahisi village. During the Dharma Vijaya yatra of Adi Shankara, he visited Mahishi village (then called Mahishmati) to debate Mandana Misra. The historical place where the renowned intellectual debate was conducted is known as Mandana Bharati Dham. Adjacent to it, there is a Shaktipeetha known as Ugratara Sthan. After winning in all discussions in all over the nation, He lost the Sastrartha there.

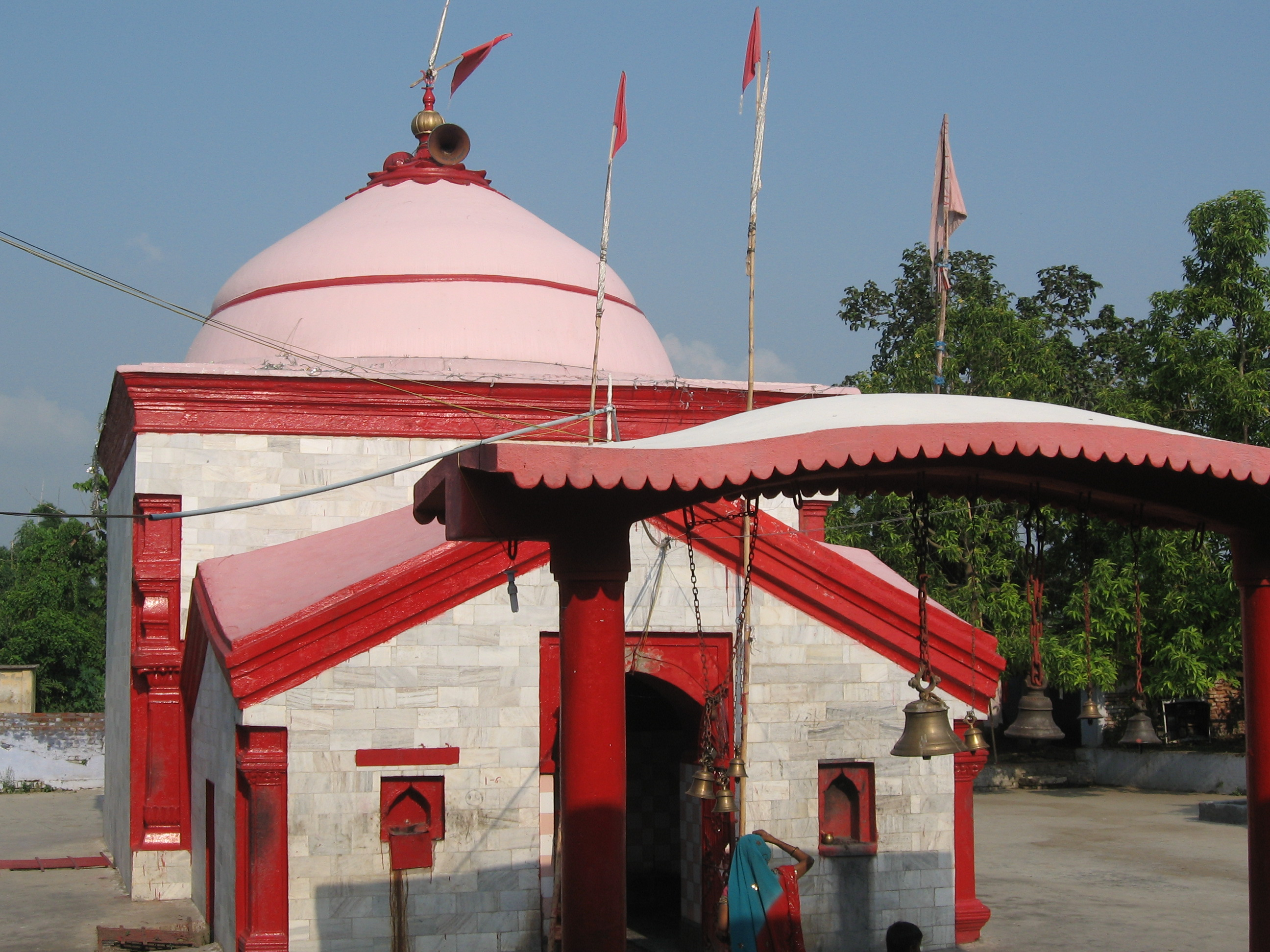
View of Ugratara Mandir at Mahishi village.

Earlier, the Saharsa district was part of the Munger and Bhagalpur districts. On 1 April 1954 it was made a district of its own. It was also made headquarters of Kosi division on 2 October 1972, comprising Saharsa, Purnia and Katihar district, with its headquarters at Saharsa. Similarly a new Civil Sub-Division Birpur was created on 1 December 1972, consisting of 24 development blocks, including Raghopur, Chhatapur, Basantpur and Nirmali, which were previously under Supaul subdivision of the district. Two new districts, Madhepura and Supaul, were formed from Saharsa district on 30 April 1981 and 1991. The Saharsa district now consists of two subdivisions, Saharsa Sadar and Simri Bakhtiarpur. The district consists of 10 development blocks and anchals each.

== Geography ==
The Saharsa district occupies an area of 1,687 square kilometres (651 sq mi),

The Saharsa district is surrounded on the west by the river Kosi, which has an abundance of fish and Makhana. Saharsa is famous for its varieties of mangoes and litchis.

The Saharsa district comprises the following sub-divisions: Saharsa Sadar and Simri Bakhtiyarpur.

== Politics ==
District	No.	Constituency	Name	Party	Alliance	Remarks
Saharsa	74	Sonbarsha (SC)	Ratnesh Sada	JD(U)	NDA	
Saharsa	75	Saharsa	Indrajeet Prasad Gupta	IIP	MGB	
Saharsa	76	Simri Bakhtiarpur	Sanjay Kumar Singh	LJP(RV)	NDA	
Saharsa	77	Mahishi	Gautam Krishna	RJD	MGB	

== Administration ==
Saharsa consists of 10 blocks arranged in two subdivisions:

=== Saharsa subdivision ===
- Nauhatta
- Sattar Kataiya
- Mahishi
- Kahara
- Sour Bazar
- Patarghat
- Sonbarsa

=== Simri Bakhtiyarpur subdivision ===
- Simri Bakhtiyarpur
- Salkhua
- Banma Itahri

== Economy ==
It is the major producer of best quality of Corn and Makhana in India. From Saharsa corn and Makhana are exported abroad country such as America, France, Japan, England. Every year 2 lakhs tonnes of corn are exported to different country and similarly Makhana also. The follgrown in the region; Makhana (Euryale ferox Salisb), rice, mangoes, litchi, bamboo, mustard, corn, wheat, ber and sugarcane. Sagwan or Tectona grandis) trees are now grown on a large scale.

== Demographics ==
Historical population
Year	Pop.	±% p.a.
1901	397,566	—
1911	409,867	+0.31%
1921	395,756	−0.35%
1931	418,762	+0.57%
1941	422,038	+0.08%
1951	489,307	+1.49%
1961	582,156	+1.75%
1971	721,202	+2.16%
1981	902,008	+2.26%
1991	1,132,413	+2.30%
2001	1,508,182	+2.91%
2011	1,900,661	+2.34%

Religions in Saharsa district (2011)
Religion	Percent
Hinduism	85.72%
Islam	14.03%
Other or not stated	0.25%

According to the 2011 census Saharsa district has a population of 1,900,661, This gives it a ranking of 247th in India (out of a total of 640). The district has a population density of 1,125 inhabitants per square kilometre (2,910/sq mi). Its population growth rate over the decade 2001–2011 was 25.79%. Saharsa has a sex ratio of 906 females for every 1000 males, and a literacy rate of 54.57%. 8.24% of the population lives in urban areas. Scheduled Castes make up 16.69% and 0.32% of the population respectively.

Languages of Saharsa district (2011)
1. Maithili (68.9%)
2. Hindi (21.1%)
3. Urdu (9.62%)
4. Others (0.36%)

At the time of the 2011 Census of India, 68.87% of the population in the district spoke Maithili, 21.15% Hindi and 9.62% Urdu as their first language.

== Notable people ==
- Mehboob Ali Kaiser - Politician and MP from Khagaria
- Yusuf Salahuddin - Politician and MLA from Simri Bakhtiarpur MR
- A. A. Khan - Physicist
- Anand Singh - politician
- Abdul Ghafoor - Politician and former minister
- Baldev Mishra - Maithili writer
- Dinesh Chandra Yadav - Politician and MP
- Jamshedpur Gopeshwar - Trade union leader and politician
- Laxminath Gosain - Yogi and Poet
- Mandana Mishra - Advaita scholar
- Ulka Gupta - TV Serial actress
- Dilkhush Kumar - Indian Entrepreneur

== See also ==
- List of villages of Saharsa
