= Bhurtiya =

Bhurtiya/Bharotiya (Ahir)
Regions with significant populations
- • India •

Languages
- • Hindi • Awadhi • Bagheli

Religion
- • Hinduism

The Bhurtiya or Bharotiya are a chiefly sub-caste of the Hindu Ahir (Yadav) caste found in the state Uttar Pradesh in India and are a sub-group within the larger Yadav community of India.

== Origin ==
The Bhurtiya are a sub-division of the Ahir community. Like other Ahirs, they claim descent from the god Krishna. They are said to have immigrated to Gujarat, where they were known as Chaurasia. About three centuries ago, these Chaurasia settled in Awadh. The etymology of the word Bhurtiya is that it is a corruption of the Hindi word phurti, which means quickness. According to their tribal legends, an ancestor of the community was in such a rush, that she left her jewellery, and was given the nickname phurti by Lord Krishna, and this name was given to her descendants. Over time this was said to be corrupted to Bhurtiya. They are found mainly in the districts of Mirzapur, Varanasi, Dihi Khurd, Prayagraj, Meerut and Mathura. They are also associated with the Lorik-legend. The kings Dal and Bal of Dalmau in Rae Bareli were from this tribe. The Bhurtiya or the Bharotiya subcaste of Ahirs were connected with Bhars according to Nesfield.

== Present circumstances ==
The Bhurtiya are divided into several gotras, such as Bamaria, Bijlauria, Darariha, Dakhinha, Matiha, Dayarba, Duhilwar, Mankathiya, Nurara and Udyana. Marriages are prohibited within the gotra, and the Bhurtiya are strictly endogamous. They are a community of settled agriculturist, with animal husbandry being a subsidiary occupation. Like other Ahirs, the community were traditionally graziers, rearing and breeding cattle. They still sell ghee and other dairy products in the towns near their villages. The Bhurtiya are Hindu, and their tribal deities are Dulhadeo, Sheetla Devi and Panch Piria.

== See also ==
- Ahir clans
- Ahir
- Yadav
- Yaduvanshi
- Gope
