= Yadavs of Nepal =

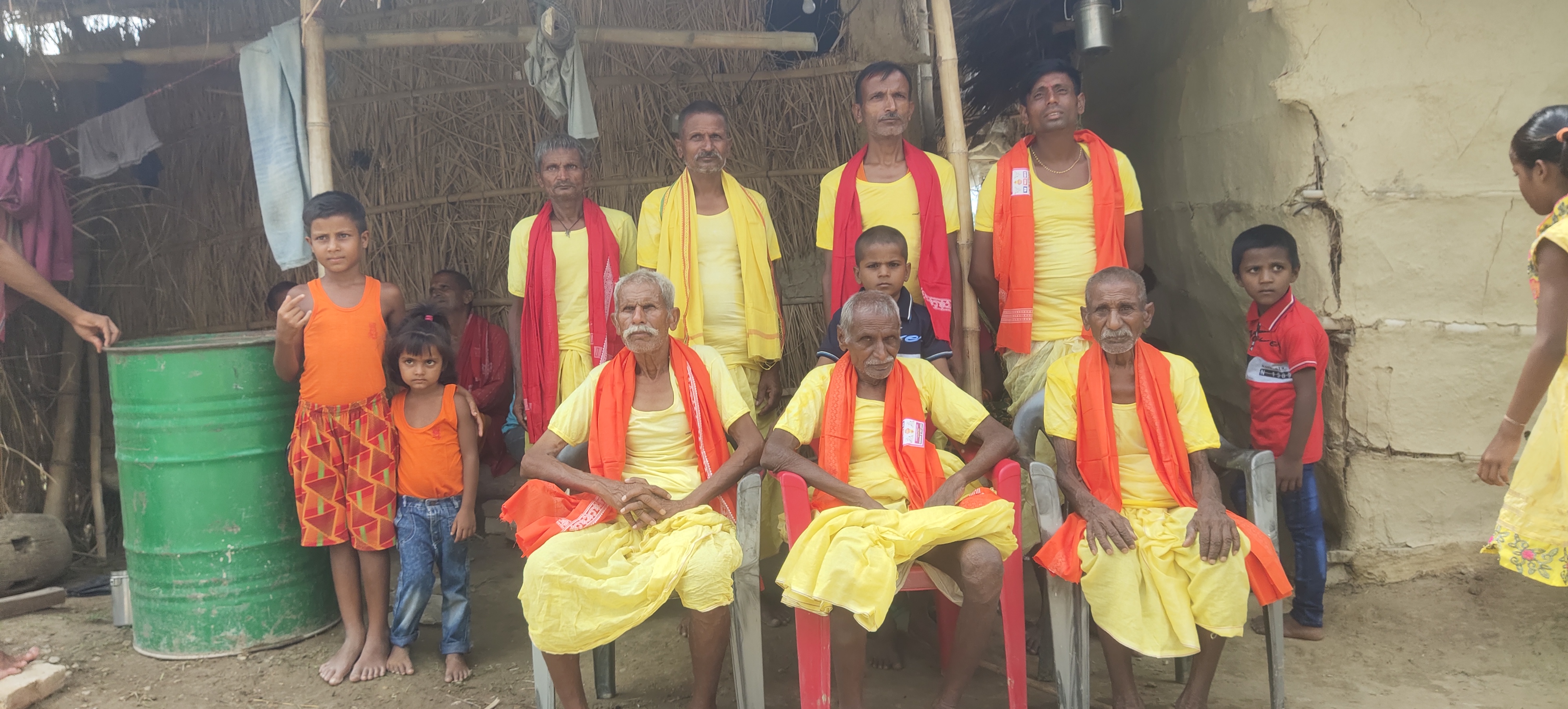

Total population
- 1,228,581

Regions with significant populations
- Nepal

Languages
- Maithili, Bajjika, Bhojpuri

Religion
- Hinduism

Related ethnic groups
- Indo-Aryan peoples

Yadavs of Nepal (Nepali: नेपालका यादवहरू), also known as Ahir or Gopa or Gowala, are a madeshi caste group in Nepal, predominantly residing in the Madhesh Province . The Central Bureau of Statistics of Nepal classifies the Yadav community under the broader social group "Madheshi Other Caste". In the 2021 Nepal census, 1,228,581 people (4.21% of the population of Nepal) identified as Yadav.

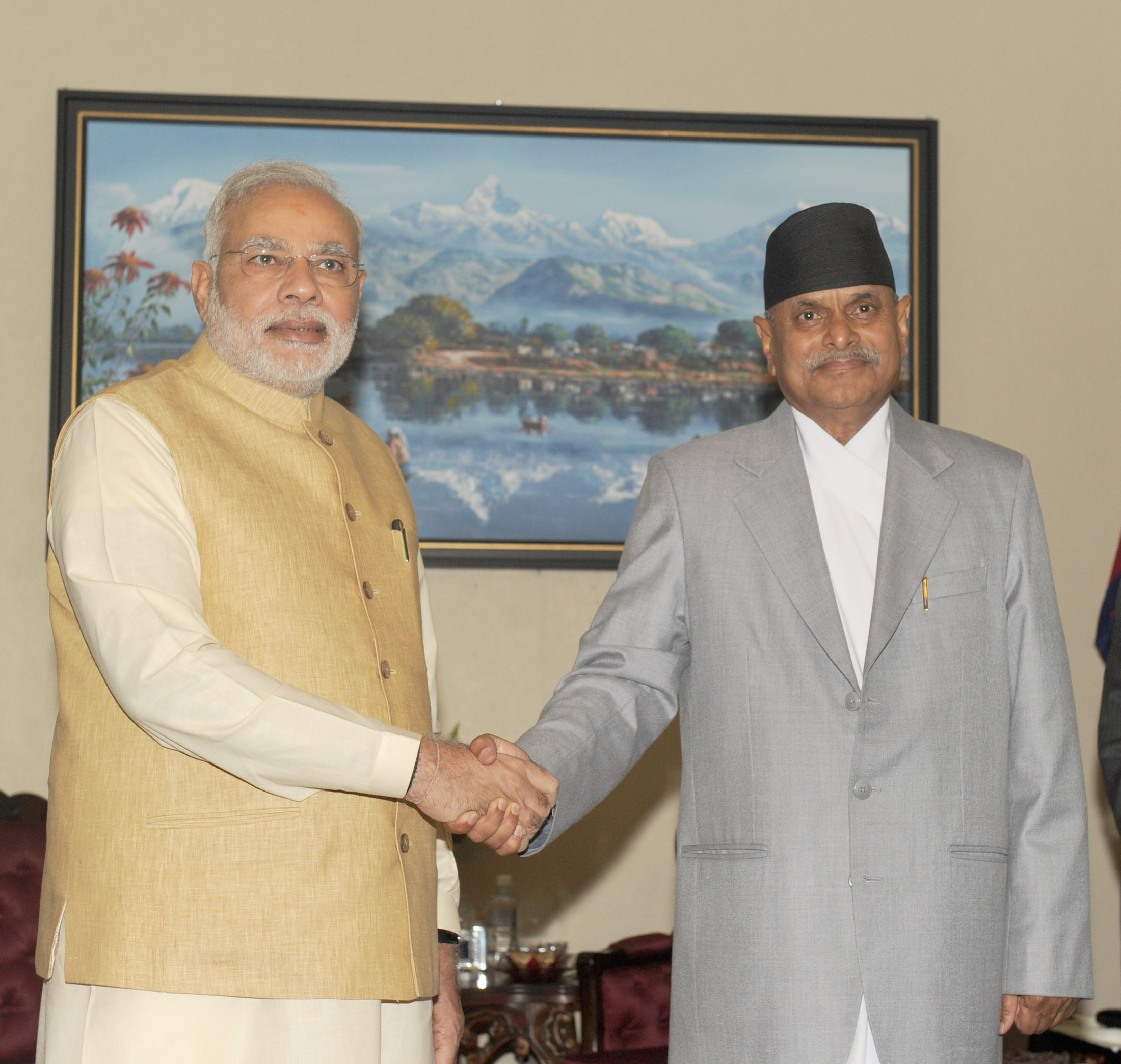
Ram Baran Yadav, the first President of Nepal, meeting Indian PM Narendra Modi.

== History ==
=== Origin ===
In Nepal, the terms Yadav, Ahir, and Gopa are often used interchangeably to refer to the same caste. The community claims descent from Krishna of the Yadu tribe mentioned in Hindu scriptures.

The Yadavs of Nepal have intimate connections with the Yadavs of Bihar, and many Yadavs from Bihar have migrated to Nepal. The ancient history of Krishnaram Marauti, Saptari and evidences from the story king Sahlesh, a king of Mithila region, proves the presence of Yadavs in the Madhesh much before the formation of present day modern Nepal.

According to David Mandelbaum, the association of the Yadav (and their constituent castes, Ahir and Gwala) with cattle has impacted their commonly viewed ritual status (varna) as Shudra, although the community's members often claim the higher status of Kshatriya. The Shudra status is explained by the nomadic nature of herdsmen, which constrained the ability of other groups in the varna system to validate the adherence to practices of ritual purity; by their involvement in castration of the animals, which was considered to be a ritually polluting act; and because the sale of milk, as opposed to personal use thereof, was thought to represent economic gain from a sacrosanct product.

== Subdivision ==
Ahirs in Nepal are mainly divided into three subcastes: Majhraut, Krishnaut and Ghosin. Some other sub-castes are also found in small numbers such as Kannaujiya, Dhadhor, and Goria.

== Population ==
The Central Bureau of Statistics of Nepal classifies the Yadav as a subgroup within the broader social group of Madheshi Other Caste. At the time of the 2011 Nepal census, 1,054,458 people (4.0% of the population of Nepal) were Yadav. The frequency of Yadavs by province was as follows:

- Madhesh Province (14.8%)
- Lumbini Province (4.1%)
- Koshi Province (1.3%)
- Bagmati Province (0.2%)
- Gandaki Province (0.0%)
- Karnali Province (0.0%)
- Sudurpashchim Province (0.0%)

The frequency of Yadavs was higher than national average (4.0%) in the following districts:

- Siraha (24.4%)
- Dhanusha (17.5%)
- Saptari (15.8%)
- Sarlahi (15.5%)
- Mahottari (15.2%)
- Rautahat (12.2%)
- Bara (10.5%)
- Kapilvastu (10.2%)
- Rupandehi (7.4%)
- Parsa (6.6%)
- Parasi (5.8%)
- Banke (4.7%)
- Sunsari (4.3%)

== Notable people ==
=== Politics ===
- Ram Baran Yadav, first President of Nepal.
- Ram Sahay Yadav, politician and current Vice President of Nepal.
- Upendra Yadav, politician and former deputy Prime Minister of Nepal.
- Saroj Yadav, politician and current Chief Minister of Madhesh province.
- Ram Saroj Yadav, politician and 1st deputy Chief Minister of Madhesh province.
- Jay Krishna Goit, Ex-Maoist Leader and leader of Janatantrik Terai Mukti Morcha.
- Manju Kumari (Yadav), Member of Public Service Commission(present), former Member of National Women Commission, Nepal.
- Matrika Prasad Yadav, politician and ex-minister.
- Chitra Lekha Yadav, Ambassador of Nepal in Australia, Ex- Education Minister of Nepal.
- Pradeep Yadav (Nepalese politician), currently Minister of Water Supply of Nepal. Ex-Minister for Health and Population of Nepal.

=== Others ===
- Jishnugupta, 7th-century Abhira-Gupta ruler.
- Bibek Yadav, Nepalese cricketer.

== See also ==
- Ahir
- Yadav
- Krishnaut
- Majhraut
