= Hindu Ghosi =

Community of Ahirs in India

- Religions: Hinduism
- Subdivisions: Mukhia, Ghurcharhe, Charia, Kasab, Mukhia, Rautele, Saundele, Mattha & Phatak etc.

The Hindu Ghosi are a community of Ahirs in India. They are divided into various sections and lineages. The Ghosis have a system of panches and hereditary chaudhris. If one of the latter's line fail, his widow may adopt a son to succeed him, or, failing such adoption, the panch elects a fit person.

== Origin ==
The Hindu Ghosi claim descent from Nanda the foster father of Krishna.

They also claim their importance saying that the sacred texts have mentioned them under the name of Ghosas. The term Ghosa refers to a settlement of the Abhira people or a temporary encampment of cowherds, which was the occupation of those people.

== Colonial description ==
The largest subdivisions of Ahir in Braj region are the Ghosis, Kamarias, Phataks and Nandvanshis. However today they all recognise themselves to be Nandvanshi Ahirs.

In the Braj region, the Ghosi and other subdivisions of Ahirs were gradually absorbed into the Nandvanshi category of landlords and into the Yaduvanshi subdivision as a consequence of British so-called "official" ethnographies and racial theories. The landlords liked the Yaduvanshi title because they considered it to be prestigious.

== Distribution ==
In the Braj area, the Ghosis are among the largest subdivisions of Ahirs along with the Kamarias, Phataks, Gwalvanshis and Nandvanshis.

== See also ==
- Ahir clans
