= Machhoya =

Clan of Ahir caste

The Machhoya (also spelled Maschoiya) are a Gotra of the Ahirs found in the Rajkot, Kutch, Junagadh, Dwarka, Amreli, Bhavnagar, Morbi, and Jamnagar districts of Gujarat in India.

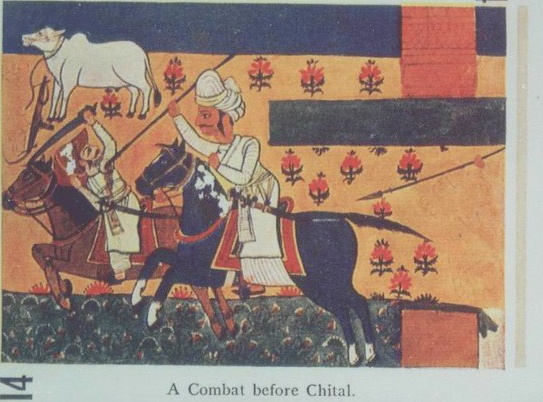
Jadav Dangar, an Ahir warrior of the Dangar clan from Saurashtra.

== Origin ==
When the Ahirs came from Mathura to Dwarka with Lord Krishna, they spread all over Saurashtra and Kutch, Gujarat region. The Maschoiya are a community of Ahirs who are said to have settled along the banks of the Machhu-katia river, and the word Maschhoiya literally means those from Macchu-katia. According to the traditions, Maschoiya were originally Samma Ahirs, and a female ancestor left Sindh for Saurashtra, where she married an Ahir king. Their descendants thus became Maschoiya Ahir. The Maschoiya Ahir are found mainly in Rajkot District, Kutch District, Morbi Maulik, Junagadh District, Amreli and Bhavnagar. They are a Gujarati speaking community.

According to the Archaeology Survey of India, Ahirs are aware of the Hindu Varna system and regard themselves as belonging to the Kshatriya Varna.

== Present circumstances ==
The Maschoiya are divided into a number of exogamous clans called Ataks like

Baraliya, Jalu (Jaru),maulik khimaniya– Lokhil, Khimaniya, Mand(Marand), Miyatra (Myatra), Makawana, Dangar, Sonara, Chaiya (Chhaiya), Bakotra (Bakutra), Virda, Kangad, Zer, Lavadiya, Meta, Herbha, Hethvadiya, Chavda, Jatiya, Lula, Balasara, Gujariya, Kothivar

Chudasama, Avadiya, Segaliya, Khatariya, Jiladiya, Kuvadiya, Garchar, Kihor and many more, all of which are of equal status. They belong to Kshatriya varna. Unlike other Ahir communities in Gujarat, the Maschoiya practice consanguineous marriages. Most of them work in the salt industry, transport, construction, farming, and extra fields.

== See also ==
- Ahir Boricha
