= Dhandhor =

Yadav Subgroup

Dhandhor or Dharhor is a subdivision of the Yadav caste in India. The Dharhors claim to have been the first settlers of the Senapur village of Jaunpur district, in modern day Uttar Pradesh, and it may be that they had the responsibility of protecting the original Thakur settlers. They are the second-most represented subcastes of Yadavs in Purvanchal (eastern region of Uttar Pradesh) after the Gwalvanshi Ahir sub-caste. They are also populated in Madhya Pradesh, Bihar and Chhattisgarh.

== Etymology ==
The word Dhandhor etymologically signifies "one whose wealth lies in cattle" being derived from dhan; wealth and dhor; hoofed cattle.

== History ==
Dhandhor (Darhore) have migrated from Dundak (Dandak) forests of Central-South India.

== Culture ==
In the areas where Awadhi, Bhojpuri, Magahi and Chhattisgarhi dialects are spoken three clans of Ahir dominate i.e. Dhandhor, Gwal and Krishnaut and it is these three main groups alone who continue the tradition of the Chanainī or Loriki singing. The buffalo-breeder/grazier Ahirs were called Dhandhors. They sell milk, curd and similar items.
