= List of folktales of Chhattisgarh =

Chhattisgarh is central state of the union of India. It is known for its cultural heritage.

== List of folktales ==
The following is a list of folktales of the state of Chhattisgarh first published by author Theophil H. Twente in 1938:

1. The Frog and the Lizard
2. The Two Who Were Brothers Indeed
3. How the Gond Saved His Field of Gram
4. Bhimsen and Fever
5. The King Who Learned From a Cock
6. The Wicked Mother-In-Law
7. How a Wedding Song Saved Property
8. The Wonderful Ox
9. The Three Drunkards
10. Satwanti
11. The Woman on a Fig Tree
12. The Girl Who Understood the Language of Birds and Beasts
13. The Brahman's Daughter Who Married a Crane
14. The Eight Foolish Weavers
15. Wealth and Wisdom
16. The Fox, the Tortoise and the Serpent
17. The Two Mendicants
18. The Bracelet-Sellers
19. The Fox and the Elephant
20. Three Men In A Boat
21. The Girl and the Goat
22. The Mouse With Three Wives
23. The Gond Who Sold Firewood
24. The Greedy Man and the Liar
25. The Secret of Knowledge
26. Two Blind Men and Their Faith

Below are other folktales attested in other sources from Chhattisgarh:

- Mohna de gori kayina
- Dhola Maru
- Fox and Mahadev
- Sada Brij Saaranga
- Vikramāditya as Bikai
- Vikramāditya with Manwa-Patwa
- Satvantin
- Thag and Big
- Kalidas and Vidyamati
- Bhalnin
- Khirmit
- Belva Kayina
- Paidhna Paidhneen
- Vikramāditya Brings Amrit
- Jheek Jheek
- Two Sadhus visiting a family and a couple
- Lal Bujakkad
- Raja Bhoj
- Raja Nal and Mata Damyanti
- Loric Chanda
- Dasmat Kayina
- Old Woman and Prawn
