= Baleshwar Yadav =

Baleshwar Yadav may refer to:

- Baleshwar Yadav (politician), Indian politician
- Baleshwar Yadav (singer), Indian folk singer in Bhojpuri

== See also ==
- Baleswar
- Yadav (disambiguation)
