= Kamaria Ahir =

Subdivision of Ahir Caste in India

Kamaria is a subdivision of Ahir or Yadav caste in India.

The Ahir Para of Mathura, i.e. the Sadar Bazaar, was established by two families originally from Kannauj, Chaudhari Parivar (the Head Family) and Dudh Parivar (the Milk Family). The Milk Family belonged to Tulsi Ram, a Sepoy of Deshwar gotra of the Kamaria clan. As of today, this family owns the Mahadev Ghat Akhara. Kamaria Ahir used to have Zamindari in Jaurasi, a village in Gwalior, Madhya Pradesh. Kamaria Ahirs are mostly found in western Uttar Pradesh and in some parts of Madhya Pradesh, which includes Mathura, Agra, Etawah (most numerous in Etawah), Mainpuri, Etah, Firozabad, Jhansi, Gwalior, Bhind, Shivpuri, and Jabalpur.

== Notables ==
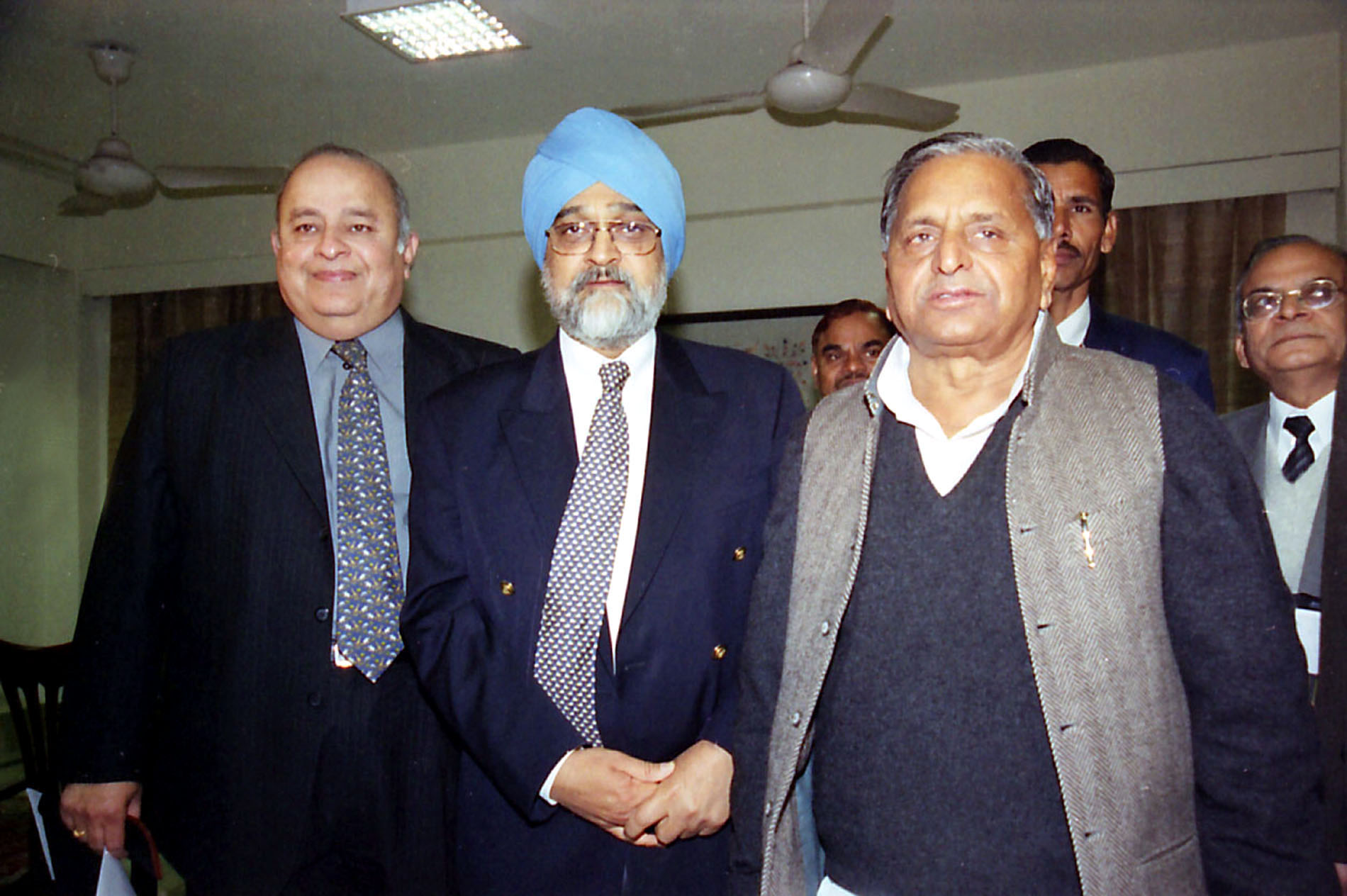
Mulayam Singh Yadav, a Kamaria Ahir (standing at right)

Notable figures include:

- Mulayam Singh Yadav, the founder of Samajwadi Party (SP), Former Chief Minister of Uttar Pradesh and former Defense Minister of India.
