= Chandayan (poem) =

Sufi epic poem written in 1379 by Maulana Daud

- by Maulana Daud
- Written: 1379 CE
- Language: Awadhi
- Genre: Sufi epic poem
- Form: masnavi
- Meter: doha and chaupai

Chandayan, or The Story of Chanda, is the first Hindi literary poem which established the genre of Sufi premkhyan or love story. It was written in 1379 CE by poet Maulana Daud who was a Chishti Sufi. The poem is composed in masnavi form (or a poem in couplets) and in the Awadhi dialect, the regional language of the eastern Gangetic plains, but was written in the Persian-Arabic script. Daud had composed the poem for the entertainment of a provincial court in North India.

== History ==
Chandayan is recognized as an important literary text in the history of Hindi literature because it pioneered a new genre of literature called Awadhi premkatha which mixed literary conventions from Persian, Apabhramsha, and oral Awadhi folk traditions. Traditionally, the masnavis that were composed for the courtly states of India were written in the Persian language and style.

manuscript of Chandayan from the Prince of Wales Museum

The word masnavi, taken from a Hebrew and Arabic word, means a story that can be interpreted on many levels. As such, Chandayan is an allegory about a man on a spiritual journey who follows the Sufi path to become closer to God as well as a love story about two characters named Chanda (the moon) and Lorik (the sun). The plot of the story takes inspiration from a popular oral folktale and epic called Candaini which was sung by Ahir singers of northern India. Candaini was also a love story about two characters called Lorik and Canva.

Succeeding poets used Chandayan as a template to create their literary works, some of which include Mirigavati, composed in 1503 by Sultan Husain Shah Sharqi of Jaunpur, Padmavat which was composed in 1540 by Malik Muhammad Jayasi, and Madhumalati which was composed by Mir Sayyid Manjhan Rajgiri in 1545.

== Author ==
Chandayan was composed by poet Maulana Daud who was a Chishti Sufi during the reign of Firoz Shah. He lived in the city of Dalmau, present day Rai Bareilli district in Bihar.

== Structure ==
Daud incorporated an elaborate, structured prologue into the poem that is traditionally found in Persian masnavis. The prologue has 17 stanzas and includes, praise to God (hamd), exhalation of the Prophet Muhammad (na't), eulogies for the four righteous Caliphs and acknowledgement to his patrons and spiritual preceptor.

== Poetic form and prosody ==
The format and structure of Chandayan served as a model for many masnavis that were created later. The poem uses meters and verse forms like doha and chaupai, and utilizes the four foot Apabhramsha meter. The poem is composed of kadavakas or stanza like units which were popular in the Awadhi language. Each kadavaka is preceded by an introductory Persian prose phrase or sentence.

== Manuscripts ==
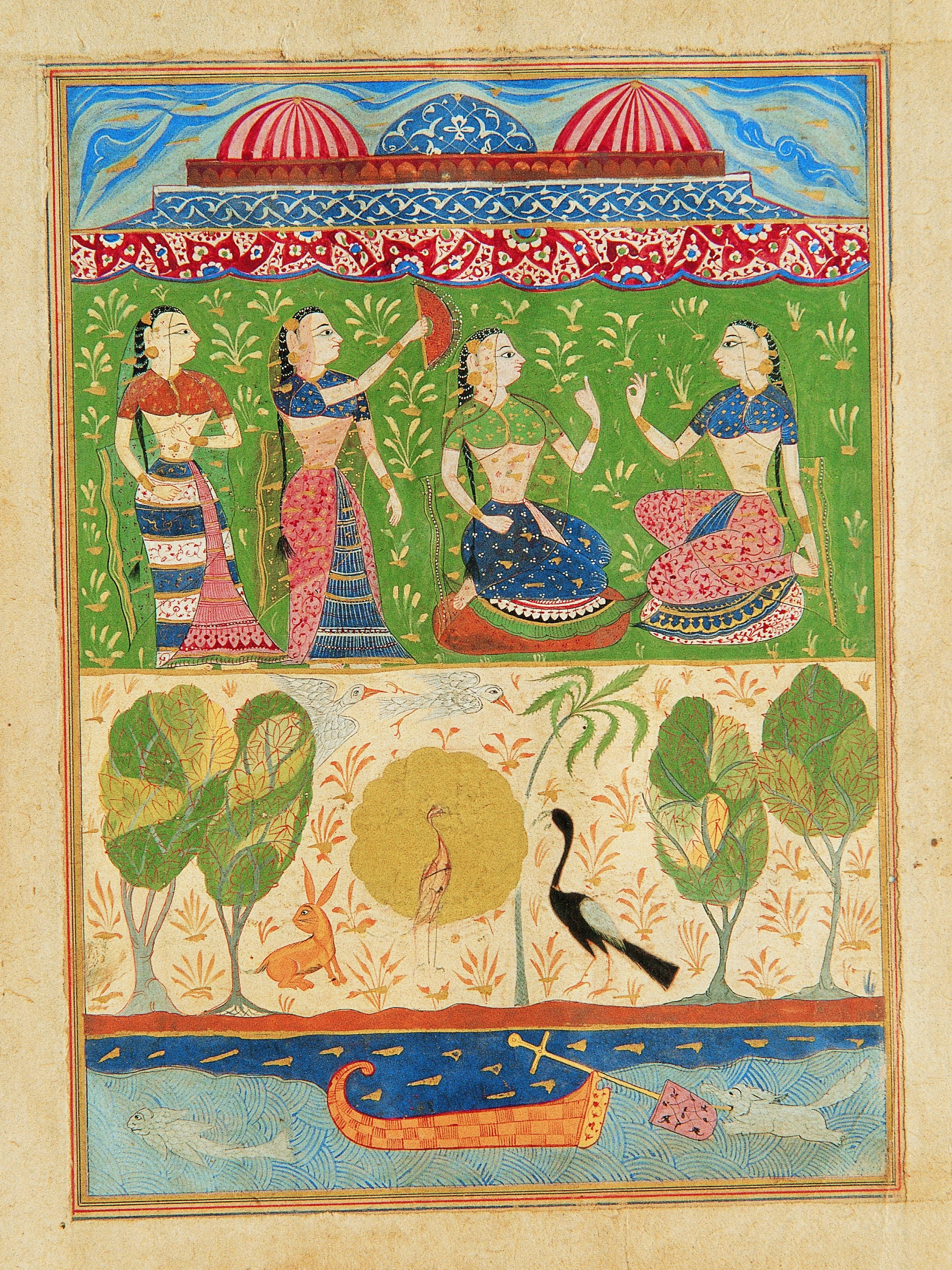
Chanda talking to a Friend, Folio from a manuscript of Laur Chanda. Probably Delhi - Jaunpur belt. Sultanate Period, 1525–1575. Chhatrapati Shivaji Maharaj Vastu Sangrahalaya

A complete Chandyan manuscript does not exist and there are only several damaged and incomplete copies which includes five illustrated versions and two unillustrated version from the 15th and 16th centuries. Folios of the manuscript are housed in the Staatsbibliothek in Berlin, John Rylands Research Institute and Library at the University of Manchester, the Bharat Kala Bhavan, in Benaras, the Chhatrapati Shivaji Maharaj Vastu Sangrahalaya in Mumbai and the Lahore Museum.
