= Phatak =

Ahir
Languages
- Hindi, Brajbhasha

Religion
- • Hindu

Phatak or Phaatak is a sub-caste of the Indian Ahir-Yadav community.

== Origin ==
Locally in Braj region, which includes Mathura, Shikohabad, Jalesar, Agra, Hathras, Aligarh, Etah, Mainpuri and Farrukhabad districts of Uttar Pradesh, Phataks are Yadav (Ahir). The Phatak clan claims to be descended from Rajput king of Chittor who married an Ahir girl Digpal, Raja of Mahaban, an Ahir.

The legend goes as: "Once the Raja of Chittor was invaded by the emperor of Delhi. One out of the 12 gates (Phataks) of the city resisted. To commemorate the signal of bravery of the guard Khatera Ahir of the 12 gate, the king issued a decree that they and their descendants should forever be known after the name of Phatak."

== History ==
The Phatak prince Bijay Singh took possession of Samohan Chaurasi area, dispossessing the Mewatis owners of the land in 1106 (samvat era). After the capture of Samohan Chaurasi area, the Phataks proceeded towards Yamuna river, displacing aborigines they established themselves in the whole Shikohabad Pargana.

The evidences show that female infanticide was practiced commonly among Chauhan Rajputs and Phatak Yadavs. In 1865, Mr. Colvin observed census of the Chauhan and Phatak villages in Mainpuri and found six villages without a single female infant.

== 1857 Mutiny ==
In the district Mainpuri, no active participation was noticed as a national attempt at the subversion of government authority. British officials later took the view that "there was no mass rising of the agricultural communities in Mainpuri but rather a struggle for the mastery between two land owning castes, the Chauhans and the Ahirs."

The Ahirs of Bharaul successfully repulsed Tez Singh while their Ahir caste brethren, Ram Ratan and Bhagwan Singh of Rampur Village kept the whole Mustafabad in a state of rebellion and fought against British rule.

== See also ==
- Ahir clans
