= Krishnaram =

Lokadevata of Guaar or Yadav in Mithila

- Lokadevata
- Member of Folk deities
- Affiliation: Hinduism
- Gender: Male
- Region: Mithila
- Ethnic group: Yadav

Genealogy
- Born: 11th century CE; Balua village, near Bhimnagar, Supaul district

Krishnaram (Maithili: कृष्णाराम) is the Lokadevata (folk deity) or Lokadeva of the Yadav community in the Mithila region of the Indian subcontinent. His vehicle was elephant named Subaran. He lived during the period of 11th century.

== Early life ==
Krishnaram was born in a family of Guaar community in the Mithila region. He was a Yaduvanshi. He was contemporary to the other folk deities Salhesh, Dina-Bhadri, etc. in the region. He belonged to Bhimnagar village located near the Kosi Barrage in the present Supaul district of Bihar. He was born in the Balua village of the district.
