= Lorikayan =

Lorikayan is the most famous story in the folklore of Bhojpuri. Its protagonist is Lorik. The sense in which the hero narrates the life-events of Lorik in this folklore full of heroic rasa, is felt to be delightful to see and hear. Lorik is remembered as one of the great historical heroes. It is also called the 'Ramayana' of the Ahir caste and is more like a tribal ballad on their origin. In the areas where Avadhi, Bhojpuri, Magahi and Chhattisgarhi dialects are spoken, three clans of Ahir dominate, i.e., Dhandhor (Danhor), Gval (or Gwalvanshi) and Krshnaut (Kishnaut) and it is these three main groups alone who continue the tradition of the Canaini or Loriki or Lorikayan singing.

This story is famous in Chhattisgarh under the name Lorik-Chanda, which is the love story of Lorik and Chanda. It is presented as a folkloric-dance-drama. The saga focuses on the love affair of married princess Chanda and married cow-herdering Ahir, Lorik. This story recounts the events that Lorik encounters, such as family opposition, and social disdain, and how he overcomes them all. The song-dance continues throughout the night, in which the men perform the Chandeni Premagatha dance in special costumes. Timki and dholak instruments are used in the dance. Besides, it has more to do with the Bhojpuri region of Uttar Pradesh and Bihar.

== Literature ==
Sufi poet Maulana Daud chose the oral epic of Lorik and Chanda to write "Chandayan", the first Hindi Sufi love poem in 1379. He believed that "Chandayan" is a divine truth and its shruti are equivalent to the verses of the Quran.

== Lorik-Chanda in Chhattisgarh ==
Lorik-Chanda in Chhattisgarh is a folk dance-drama. It is one of Chhattisgarh's major performance arts. This folk dance in Balod district is particularly popular. Its heroine, Chanda, is the daughter of King Mahar. The king has wed her to a person who is often ill. Lorik is a 'gwala' from the Ahir caste who grazes cows. He is charming, strong and takes pride in his Raut society. Princess Chanda is charmed by Lorik's flute playing skills and falls in love with him.

When Chanda was returning to her husband's home, a man named Bathua tried to assault her. Lorik saves Chanda in time. Chanda is captivated by his valor while Lorik is mesmerized by her beauty. Both of them instantly fall in love and begin to meet regularly.

One day, Lorik went to the city to buy goods. Princess Chanda devises a plan to have Lorik for herself. All the girls in the market were fawning over Lorik. Chanda takes the help of an old lady named Malin. The old lady goes to the market to call Lorik and tells him that his grandfather has brought a new cow and a calf. She tells him that its very upsetting and it will be great if he walked home and saw to it.

One day, both decide to run away from home. Enraged by this decision of married lovers, Chanda's husband Veerabavan tries to kill them but fails. On their way, a snake bites Lorik, but he recovers by the grace of the Gods Mahadev and Parvati. Later on, Lorik wins the battle over the King of Karingha.

Living happily with Chanda, Lorik later receives news that his impoverished first wife Manjari is on the verge of begging and their cows have been lost. Lorik comes back to his village with Chanda to save his wife and looks for his cows. His wife's envy leads to a brawl between Manjari and Chanda. Manjari wins but Lorik is saddened to see the devastating outcome of his actions and leaves everything to become a wanderer.

Lorik Chanda's saga is seen as a magical link to create an analogy between inequality as the protagonist is a Yaduvanshi and feeds the cow while the heroine is the king's daughter. Folk admirer Ram Hriday Tiwari considers this saga to be an unmitigated desire to seek the love of two human beings. Ramakant Srivastava, a narrator who has done a detailed study on folklore, says that the society does not look at the love affair of a married woman and man with good eyes, but stereotypes appear to be broken in the saga of Lorik-Chanda. In this, we get acquainted with the mature love of married people.
