= Raghunath Vithal Khedkar =

Indian surgeon and historian

Raghunath Vithal Khedkar (Yadava) (born in Bombay on 16 October 1873 in the family of the maratha Kshatriy concubines) was an Indian surgeon. In 1959, he revised, enlarged, and published a historical work written by his father, Vithal Krishnaji Khedkar: The Divine Heritage of the Yadavas.

Khedkar studied medicine and surgery in the United Kingdom, at Edinburgh and Glasgow. He practised medicine in Newcastle-on-Tyne before returning to India at the start of World War I, and serving as a surgeon in Bombay, Kolhapur, and Nepal. Among the younger Khedkar's honors were membership in London's Society of Tropical Medicine, and Hygiene and the Royal Sanitary Institute.
