= G. S. Ghurye =

Founder of Indian sociology (1893–1983)

- Born: 12 December 1893; Malvan, Bombay Presidency, British India
- Died: 28 December 1983 (aged 90); Bombay, Maharashtra, India
- Citizenship: Indian (formerly British subject
- Education: University of Cambridge
- Spouse: Sajubai Ghurye.
- Scientific career
- Fields: Sociology, Anthropology
- Workplaces: University of Bombay
- Doctoral advisor: W. H. R. Rivers & A. C. Haddon

Govind Sadashiv Ghurye (12 December 1893 – 28 December 1983) was a pioneering Indian academic who was a professor of sociology. In 1924, he became the second person to head the Department of Sociology at the University of Bombay. And, is widely regarded as the founder of Indian Sociology & Sociology in India.

== Early life ==
G S Ghurye was born, in a Saraswat Brahmin community on 12 December 1893, at Malvan, in present-day Maharashtra. His early schooling was at the Aryan Education Society's High School, Girgaum, in Bombay, and then at Bahadur Khanji High School, Junagadh, in the princely state of Junagadh. He joined Bahauddin college at Junagarh, in 1912, but moved on to Elphinstone College, Bombay, after a year, and received his B. A. (Sanskrit) and M. A. (Sanskrit) degrees from there. He earned the Bhau Daji prize with his B. A., and the Chancellor's gold medal with his M. A. degree. After completing his M. A., Ghurye received a scholarship for further studies in England, and earned his PhD from Cambridge University in 1922. Ghurye was deeply influenced by W. H. R. Rivers, who was his PhD guide. After Rivers' untimely death in 1922, he completed his thesis under A. C. Haddon.

== Personal life ==
Ghurye was married to Sajubai of Vengurla, a town near Malwan. His son, Sudhish Ghurye is a Mathematician and Statistician, and daughter Kumud G. Ghurye was a barrister.

== Career ==
Ghurye was appointed as Head of the Department of Sociology in Bombay University in 1924, and retired in 1959. The department was founded by Patrick Geddes in 1919. However, when Ghurye took it over, it was on the verge of closure. The department came alive once again with Ghurye, and now, Ghurye is regarded as the real founder and "shaped" the study of sociology there from then on.

He also founded the Indian Sociological Society and its newsletter, Sociological Bulletin, and served as head for both. He also headed the Bombay Anthropological Society for some years.

After retirement, he served as Professor Emeritus for Bombay University and at least three festschrifts were produced in his honour, of which two were during his lifetime. He guided a total of 80 research theses and authored 32 books and a number of other papers. Later, at least two theses were written on him.

Among his students were personalities like noted social reformer and intellectual Dr. Uttamrao K. Jadhav, A. J. Agarkar, Y. M. Rege, L. N. Chapekar, M. G. Kulkarni, M. S. A. Rao, Iravati Karve, C. Rajagopalan, Y. B. Damle, M.N. Srinivas, A. R. Desai, D. Narain, I. P. Desai, M. S. Gore, Suma Chitnis and Victor D'Souza. He also had the opportunity to see the "Dr. G. S. Ghurye Award" being instituted in his honour. His book Caste and race in India is regarded as a classic in the field.

== Publications ==
- G.S. Ghurye (2008) [1932]. Caste and race in India. Popular Prakashan. ISBN 978-81-7154-205-5.
- Govind Sadashiv Ghurye (1943). The aborigines -"so-called" – and their future. Pub. by D.R. Gadgil for the economics.
- G. S. Ghurye (1951). Indian costume, bhāratīya veṣabhūsā. the Popular book depot.
- Govind Sadashiv Ghurye (1952). Race relations in Negro Africa. Asia Pub. House.
- Govind Sadashiv Ghurye (1995) [1953]. Indian Sadhus. Puopular Prakashan, Bombay.
- Govind Sadashiv Ghurye (1956). Sexual Behaviour of the American Female. Current Book House.
- Govind Sadashiv Ghurye (1957). Caste and class in India. Popular Book Depot.
- Govind Sadashiv Ghurye (1958). Bhāratanāṭya and its costume. Popular Book Depot.
- Govind Sadashiv Ghurye (1960). After a century and a quarter: Lonikand then and now. Popular Book Depot.
- Govind Sadashiv Ghurye (1962). Cities and civilization. Popular Prakashan.
- Govind Sadashiv Ghurye (1962). Gods and men, by G. S. Ghurye.
- Govind Sadashiv Ghurye (1962). Family and kin in Indo-European culture. Popular Book Depot.
- Govind Sadashiv Ghurye (1963). The Mahadev Kolis. Popular Prakashan.
- Govind Sadashiv Ghurye (1963). Anatomy of a rururban community. Popular Prakashan.
- Govind Sadashiv Ghurye (1963). Anthropo-sociological papers. Popular Prakashan.
- Govind Sadashiv Ghurye (1965). Religious consciousness. Popular Prakashan.
- Govind Sadashiv Ghurye (1968). Social tensions in India. Popular Prakashan.
- Govind Sadashiv Ghurye (1973). I and other explorations. Popular Prakashan.
- Govind Sadashiv Ghurye (1974). Whither India?. Popular Prakashan.
- Govind Sadashiv Ghurye; S. Devadas Pillai (1976). Aspects of changing India: studies in honour of Prof. G. S. Ghurye. Popular Prakashan.
- Govind Sadashiv Ghurye (1977). Indian acculturation: Agastya and Skanda. Popular Prakashan.
- Govind Sadashiv Ghurye (1978). India recreates democracy. Popular Prakashan. ISBN 9780842616072.
- G. S. Ghurye (December 1979). Legacy of the Ramayana. South Asia Books. ISBN 978-0-8364-5760-5.
- Govind Sadashiv Ghurye (1979). Vedic India. Popular Prakashan.
- Govind Sadashiv Ghurye (1 January 1980) [1963]. The scheduled tribes of India. Transaction Publishers. pp. 1–. ISBN 978-0-87855-692-2.
- Govind Sadashiv Ghurye (1980). The burning caldron of north-east India. Popular Prakashan.
- G.S. Ghurye (1 January 2005). Rajput Architecture. Popular Prakashan. ISBN 978-81-7154-446-2.
