= Yadav (disambiguation) =

Yadav refers to a grouping of communities or castes in the Indian subcontinent.

Yadav may also refer to:

- Yadav (surname), modern Indian adopted surname
- Yadav Wadi, a village in Ahmednagar district, Maharashtra, India
- Yadava, ancient Indian peoples
- Seuna (Yadava) dynasty (c. 1187–1317), an ancient Indian dynasty

== See also ==
- Yaduvanshi (disambiguation)
- Jadhav, an Indian surname
- Yadu (legendary king), a ruler described in Hindu texts
