= Sadar (festival) =

Yadav buffalo carnival in Telangana, India

- Observed by: Yadav community in Hyderabad, India
- Type: Cultural
- Observances: Celebration of Buffalo
- Date: The 2 days following Hindu festival Diwali
- Frequency: annual

Sadar (సదర్‌) is a buffalo carnival celebrated annually by the Yadav community of Hyderabad, Telangana, India as a part of Diwali. It is also known as Dunnapothula panduga (దున్నపోతుల పండుగ) ('Festival of the Buffalo Cattle' in Telugu) and it occurs on the second day after Diwali.

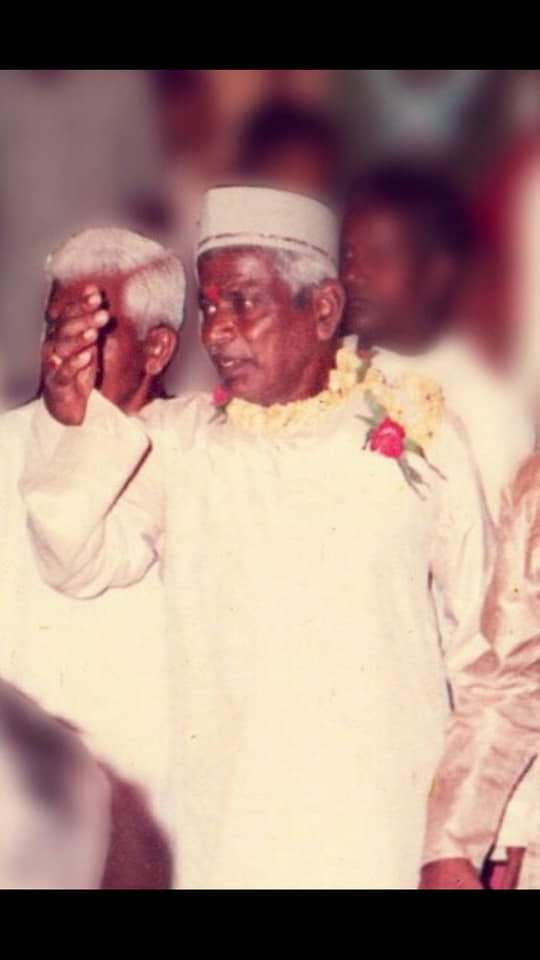
Salandri Nyayam Chowdhary Mallaiah Yadav (Sadar Founder)

The buffaloes are decorated with garlands of flowers, painted horns, and paraded through the streets, often accompanied by the crowd dancing to the sounds of teen maar Special Yadav Band (Da Daniki). The animals are sometimes encouraged to rear up on their hind legs.

Sadar was started by the late Sri Salandri Nyayam Chowdhary Mallaiah Yadav in 1946 at Naryanguda YMCA, Hyderabad. Even though over time Sadars have been organized in many other localities of Hyderabad by their respective Chowdhary, Narayanguda YMCA Sadar (near Reddy women's college) attracts largest crowd due to its history and popularity. Hence is called Pedha Sadar. Narayanguda YMCA Sadar has been organized uninterruptedly annually starting 1946 till date by its founder late Sri Salandri Nyayam Chowdhary Mallaiah Yadav and later by his family members.

Other notable locations where Sadar is conducted are Deepak Talkies, Saidabad, Ameerpet and Khairatabad. There are many more coming up every year due to Sadar's popularity but above are long running and have historic importance.

== Etymology, Locations and Dates ==
=== Etymology ===
The word Sadar means main congregation. The Sadar held in Narayanguda YMCA is the biggest congregation of all.

=== Locations ===
- Naryanguda YMCA Sadar - near Reddy Women's College
- Shaikpet-Darga Sadar
- Deepak Talkies Sadar - near Deepak Talkies, Narayanguda
- Saidabad Sadar
- Kairthabad Sadar
- Ameerpet sadar
- Karwan Sadar
- Langer Houz Sadar
- Madhapur Sadar

=== Dates ===
Narayanguda YMCA Sadar, which is biggest of all, is celebrated annually in Hyderabad 2 days after Diwali. It is on last of 5-day Diwali celebrations by Yadav community in Hyderabad.

It is conducted in other locations either on the day of Deepavali or 1 day after Deepavali so that people from all locations can attend Pedha Sadar on 3rd day (2 days after Deepavali) at Narayanguda YMCA and take part in largest congregation of Yadavs.

== Go Puja ==
The Sadar Festival starts with Chowdhary performing Go Puja.

=== Go Puja ===
This is one of the variants of Govardhan Puja being performed. In this variant of the ritual, a goddess (Lakshmi Puja) is made out by spreading cow dung as base layer and then Rangoli decoration is added as second layer and top layer a mountain is made of puffed rice, sweet candy and decorated pots. After completing the idol, an earthen lamp (diya) is placed on top. This represents Govardhan giri.

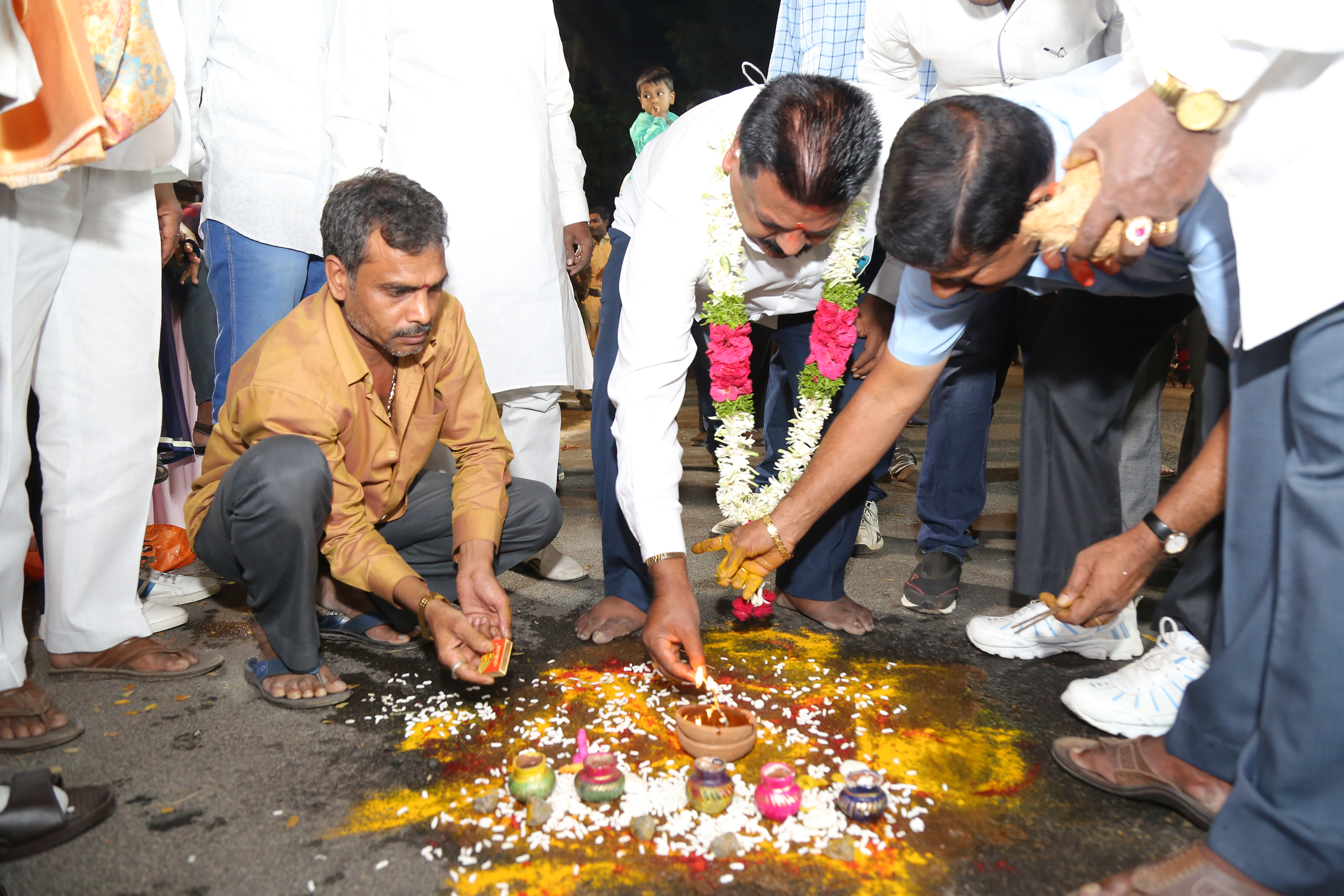
Go puja being performed by Yadav Chowdary

=== Carnival starts ===
Once puja is completed, the first male buffalo in the procession is brought over and made to stomp over the lit diya. This is the official commencement of the Sadar festival.

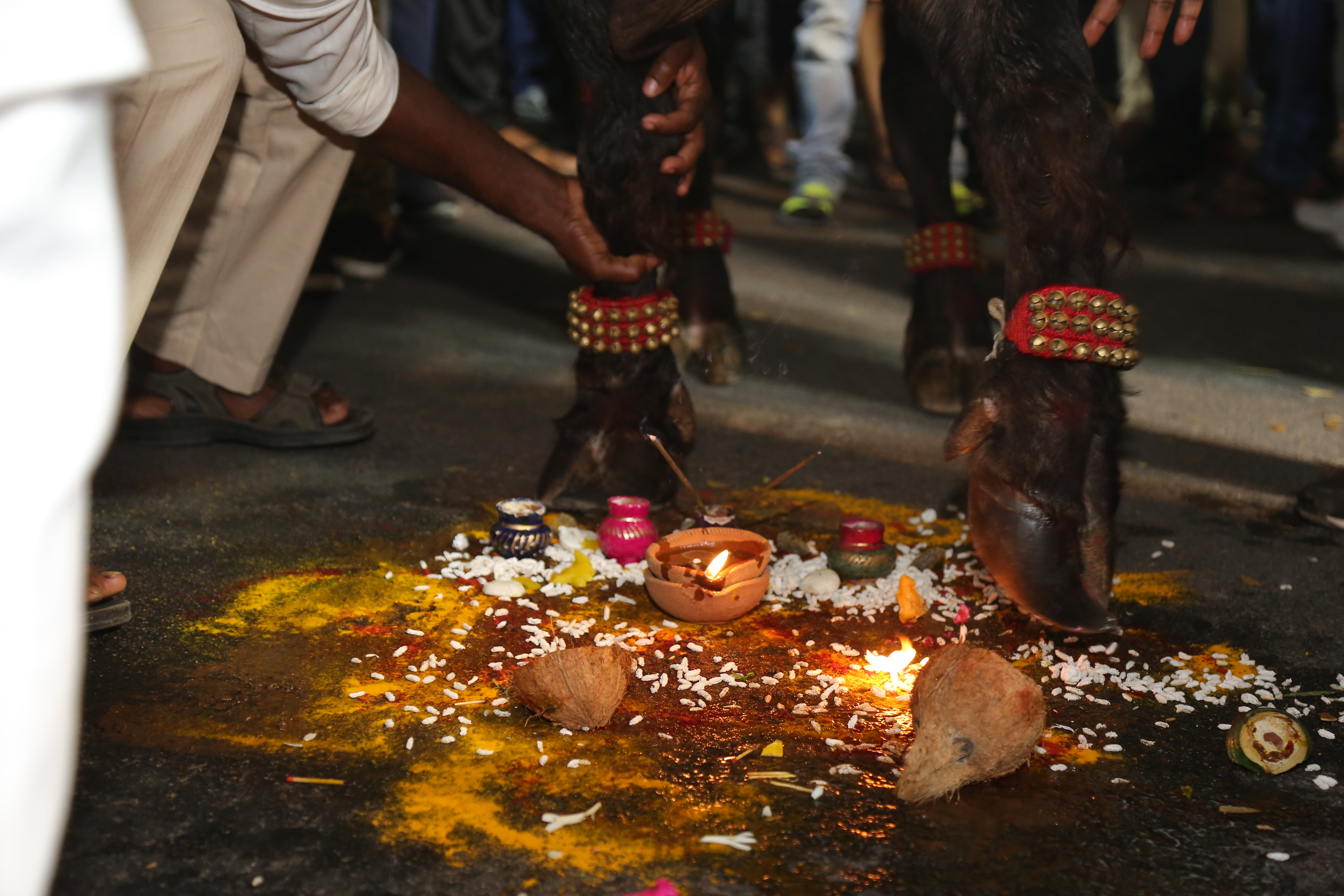
Buffalo Stomps Diya closeup

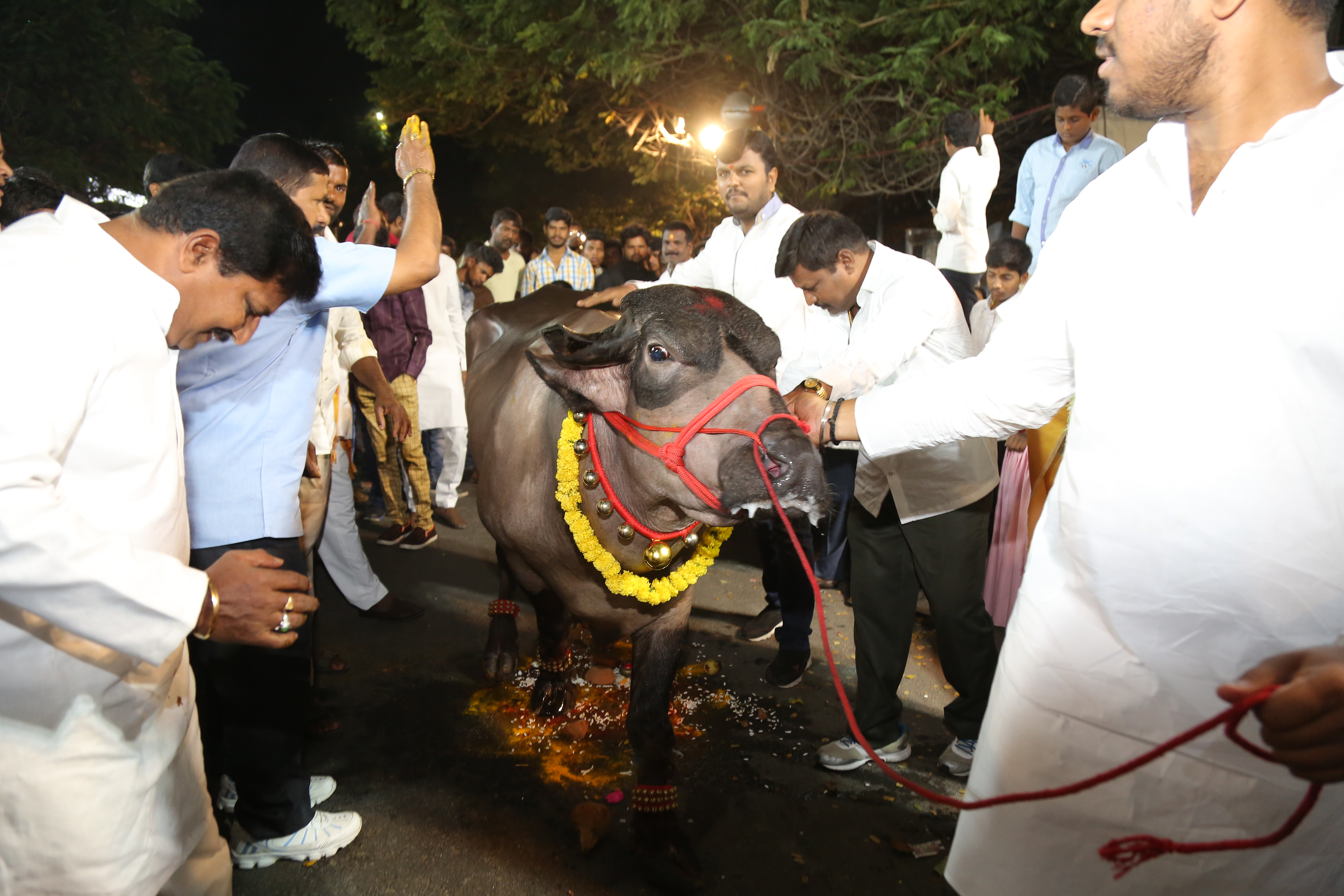
Buffalo Stomps Diya at Sadar

With this, the Carnival/Procession of Sadar starts and each family with their Dunnapothu (Male Buffalo) come with all fanfare.

== Festival Highlights ==
Buffaloes are the main highlight of the parade, as the community is dependent on cattle for their livelihood. They take special care in breeding cattle which mainly consists of water buffaloes and cows. Bulls are bred mainly for bigger height, weight and length of body. They are also considered better by amount of milk their female offsprings yield. Other details like looks, age, horn style, length of tail are considered. Hence Sadar becomes occasion to display these special bulls to rest of community.

=== Buffalo Decoration ===
Every family takes this opportunity to showcase their best male buffalo to the rest of the community in the parade. Buffaloes are decorated by shining them with oil, painting their horns/body with bright colors, garlands around neck, anklets (gajjalu) on their feet, sea-shell bands with bells around neck or foreheads and also adorned with peacock feathers cases on their horns.

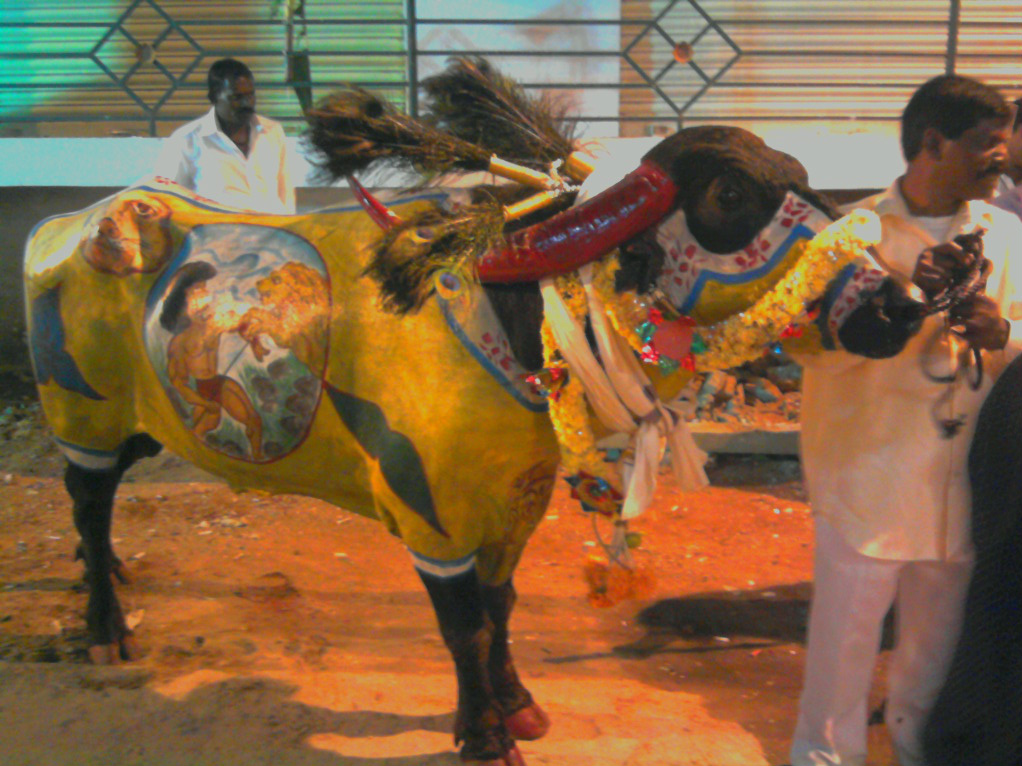
A Buffalo decorated for Sadar carnival

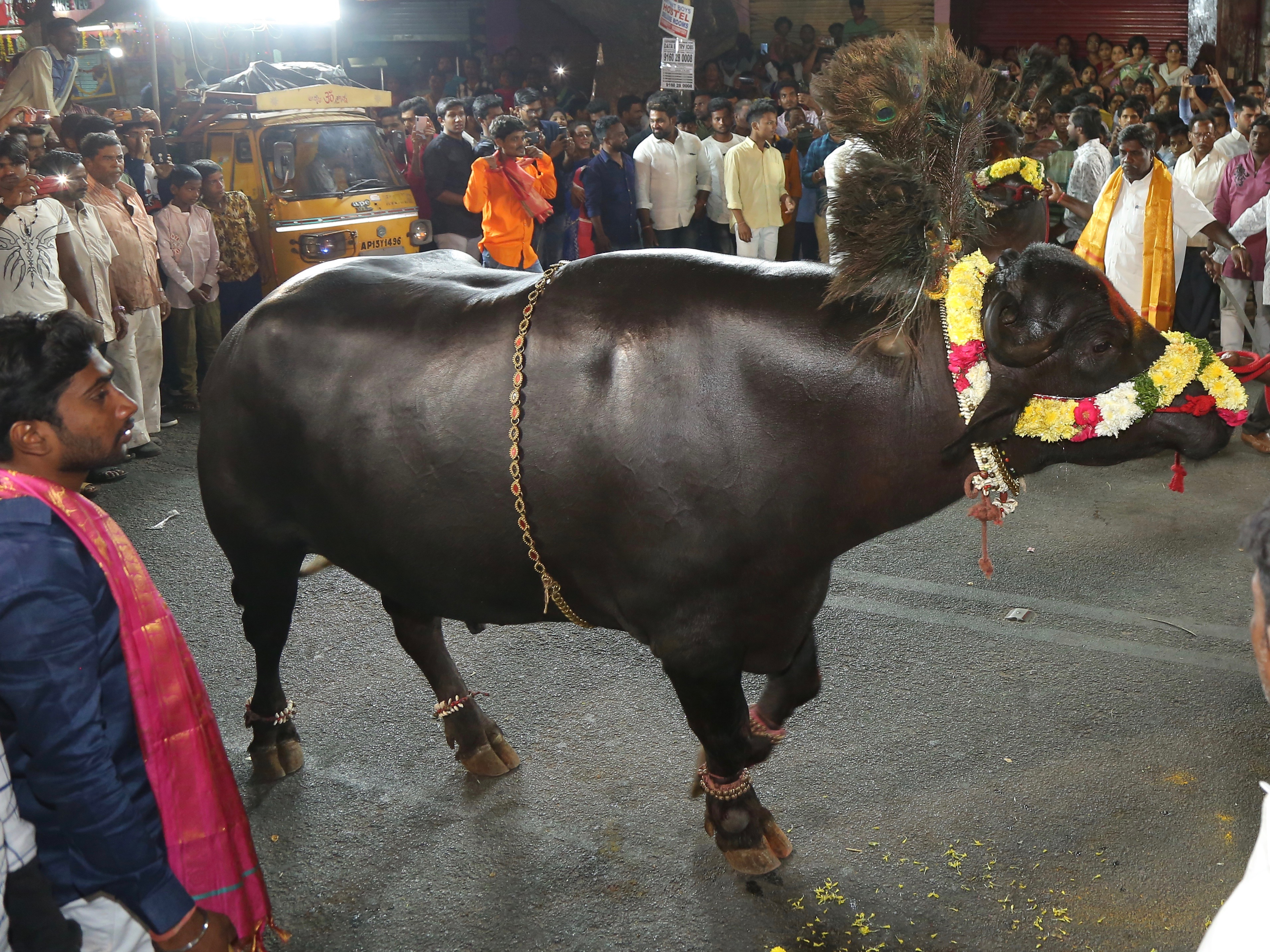
Decorated Buffalo Bull

=== Buffalo Salam ===
Some families also make their buffalo do salam and dandam to show respect and obedience to Chowdary. Families train their buffaloes for months to perform these two types of salutes. In the end it displays the agility of buffalo to be able to stand only on its hind legs.

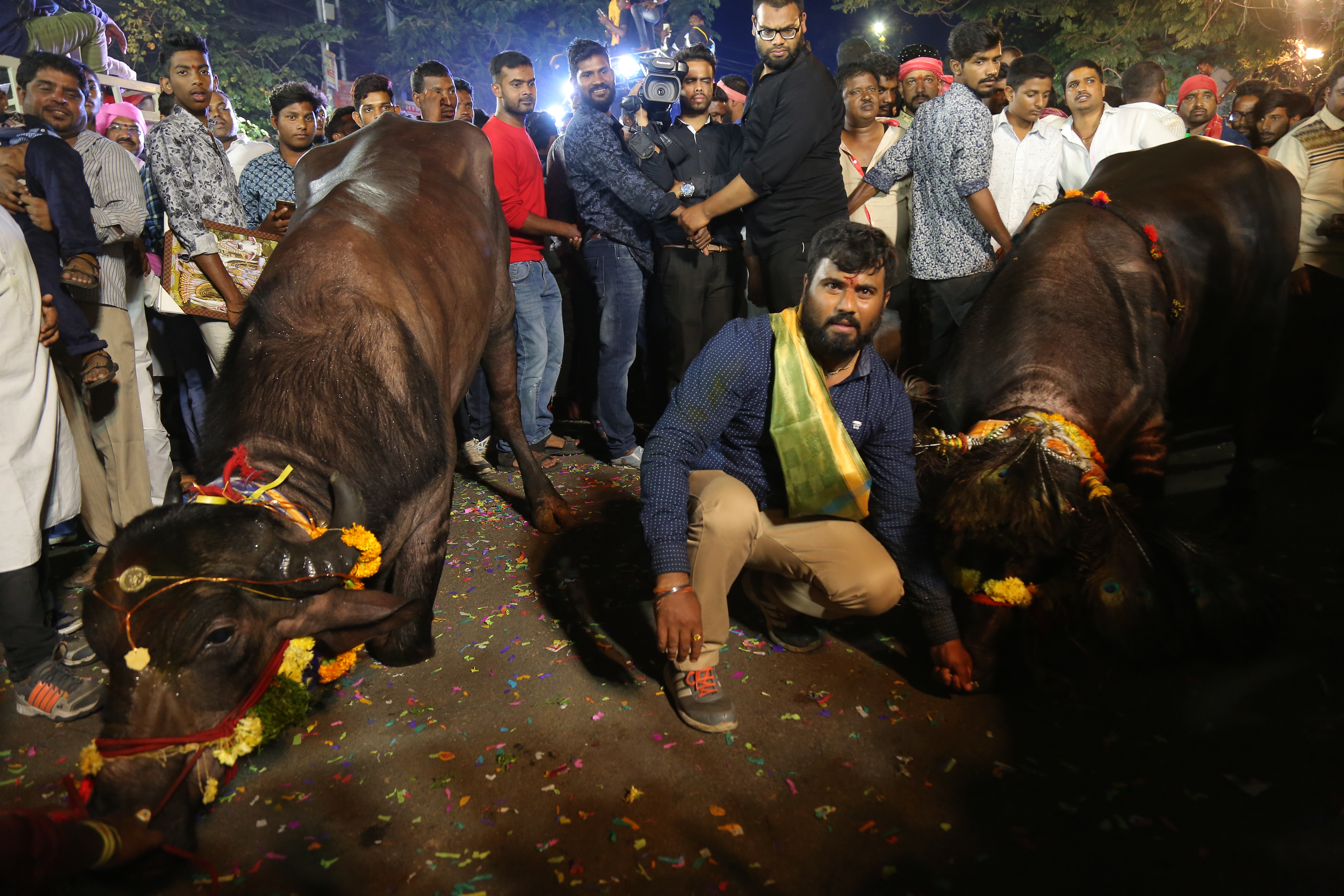
Buffalo Dandam- Buffalo is made to bow down by folding front legs and facing down

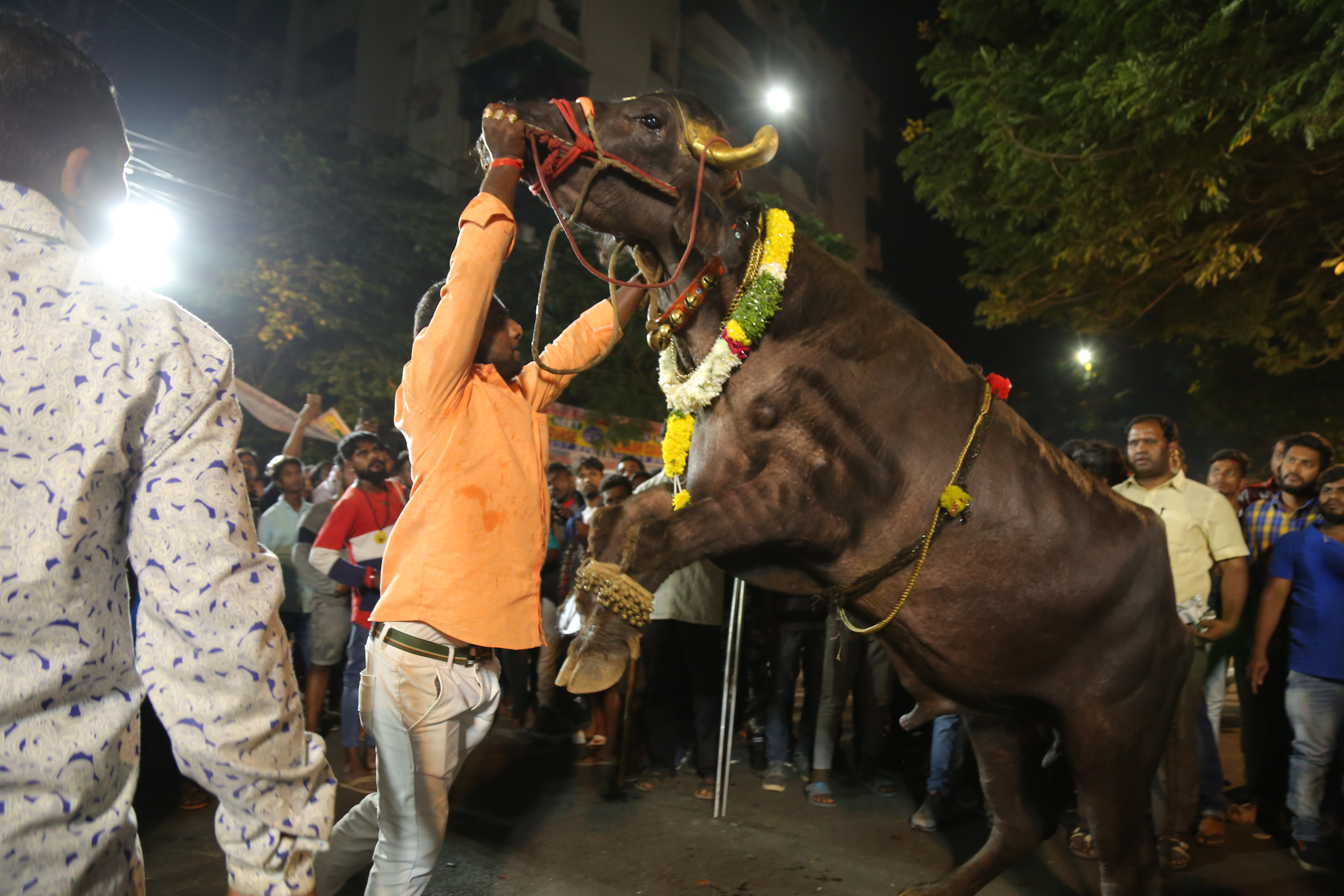
Buffalo Salute - Buffalo is made to stand on hind legs which looks like it is saluting

=== Alai Balai ===
All the community members wish each other Deepavali wishes and take Alai-Balai. Alai balai is a way of hugging another person from either side of shoulders.

=== Da-Dan-Ki beats ===
Another highlight of this festival is Yadavs play unique tune during the parade called Da-Dan-Ki tune. This tune is so unique and reserved for Yadavs that now it is being simply called as Yadav tune. This music is also associated with special stepped dance that will be performed by Yadav men. In this dance, men form an circle holding hockey sticks in one hand and taking big steps back and forth and circling around at same time. This dance is also called 'pedha puli ata' which means tiger dance as it looks like men are imitating tiger's gait and moves. Likewise this dance is more commonly being called as Yadav dance.
