= Ahir Boricha =

Subgroup of Ahir community in Gujarat, India

The Boricha clans are a part of the Ahir caste found in the state of Gujarat in India.

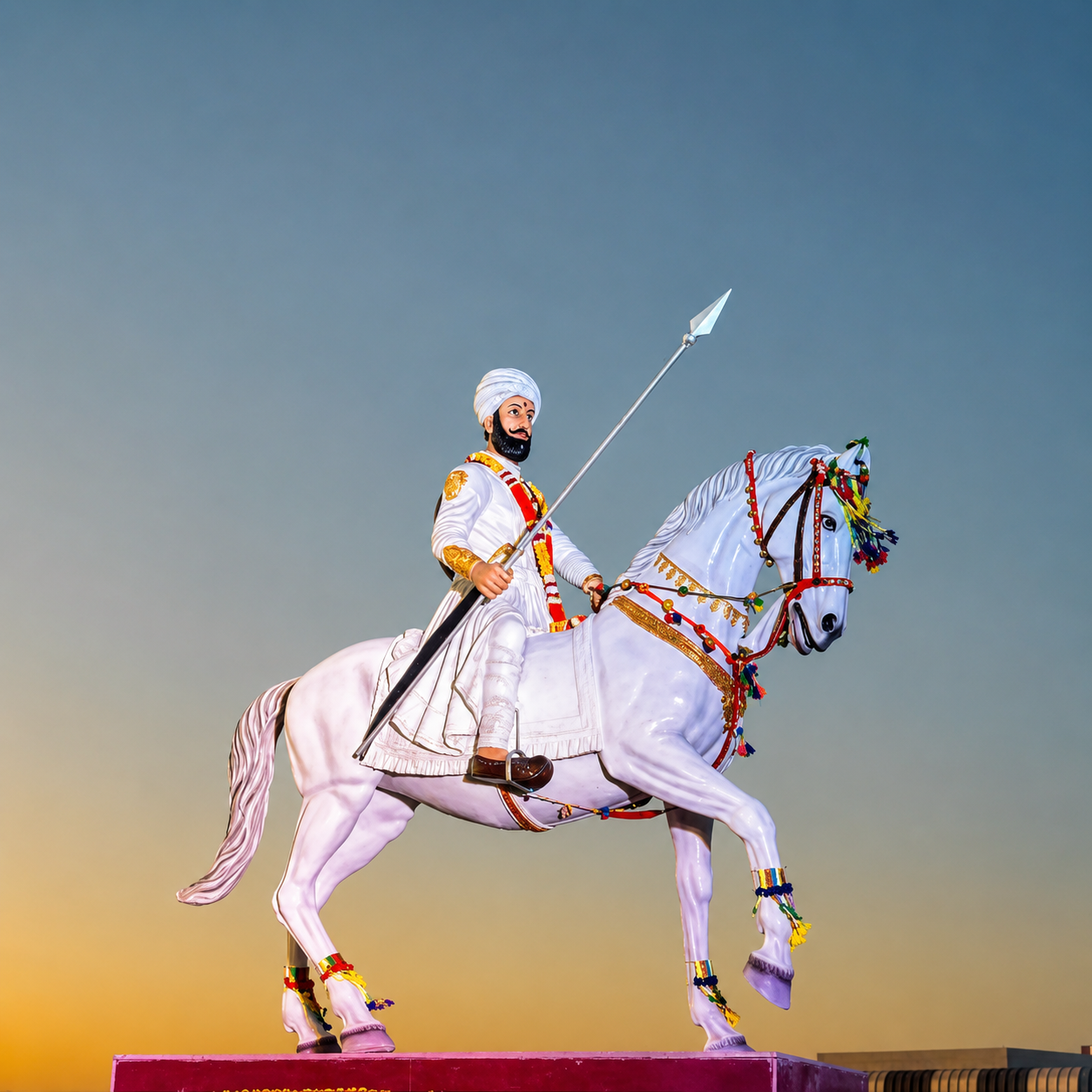
statue of Ahir Hamir AAPA dangar

== Origin ==
The Boricha Ahirs get their name from the Boricha region of Kutch, which was their original homeland, from where they emigrated to Jamnagar District due to a drought.

According to other traditions, the word Boricha means those who are of value. The community are now found in the Jhodia taluka of Jamnagar District, Kutch District, Morvi in Rajkot District and Junagadh District. They still speak the Gujrati and Kutchi language. According to the Archaeology Survey of India, Ahirs are aware of the Hindu Varna system and regard themselves as belonging to the Kshatriya Varna

The Boricha Ahirs are Hindu, and worship Hindu gods and goddesses such as Ram, Shankar, Ganesh, Krishna and Lakhshmi.
