= Yuganta: The End of an Epoch =

Book by Irawati Karve

- Author: Irawati Karve
- Original title: युगान्त
- Language: Marathi
- Genre: Non fiction
- Publication date: 1967
- Publication place: India

Yuganta: The End of an Epoch is a book written by anthropologist Irawati Karve. It is a critical analysis of the Mahabharata. The book was written in Marathi originally and was translated in English by W. Norman Brown. It was translated into Nepali by Sujit Mainali and was published in October 2020 by Kathmandu-based publishing house Book Hill.

== Summary ==
This book is a study of the main protagonists of the Mahabharata. These character studies treat the protagonists of the book as historical figures rather than as mythical characters. In this book the author has attempted to interpret many of the events of the Mahabharata in a socio-political context. According to Karve's analysis, the Mahabharata is not really a myth, but is an account of historical events that actually took place many thousands of years ago, in the nation of India. In this context, the author provides the readers with in-depth insight into the political and social situations that were prevalent during that period in Indian history.

== Award ==
The book won Sahitya Academy Award in 1968.
