= Yaduvanshi =

Yaduvanshi, Yaduvamsha, or Yadava was a mythological dynasty of ancient India reputed to have descended from the legendary king Yadu.

Yaduvanshi may also refer to:

- Yaduvanshi Rai, Indian politician from Bihar, India

== See also ==
- Seuna (Yadava) dynasty, a medieval Indian dynasty
- Yadav, a modern Indian community claiming descent from the mythological king Yadu
- Yadav (disambiguation)
- Yadu, historical Rigvedic tribe
- Yadu (legendary king)
