= M. S. A. Rao =

Madhugiri Shamarao Anathapadmanabha Rao
- Born: 26 September 1926
- Died: 12 December 1985 (aged 59)
- Known for: Sociology

Madhugiri Shamarao Anathapadmanabha Rao (1926–1985) was a professor of sociology who had been a founder-member in 1959 of the Department of Sociology at the University of Delhi, India. He wrote and edited extensively on subjects such as the social aspects of nutrition, both urban and rural sociology, the sociology of migration, and social dominance. He conducted much fieldwork as a part of his researches.

== Birth ==
Rao was born on 26 September 1926

== Education and career ==
Before involvement at the University of Delhi, Rao had studied at the University of Bombay, and it was there that he formed a lifelong association with G. S. Ghurye. Rao went on to hold visiting appointments in both the United States (at Syracuse University and the University of Pennsylvania) and in Britain (at the School of Oriental and African Studies). He was a frequent participant in academic conferences and travelled widely in order to do so. Recognition of his work came in various forms, including receipt of the G. S. Ghurye Award in 1979, the S. C. Roy Memorial Gold Medal of The Asiatic Society in 1982, and the publication of at least one gedenkschrift.

== Death and legacy ==
Rao died on 12 December 1985, at which point he was, according to Andre Beteille, "at the height of his professional career". Following his death, a memorial scholarship and an academic award were named for him.

== Selected works ==
- Rao, M. S. A. (1957). Social change in Malabar. Bombay: Popular Book Depot. OCLC 586456586.
- Rao, M. S. A. (1970). Urbanization and social change: A study of a rural community on a metropolitan fringe. New Delhi: Orient Longmans. OCLC 631212837.
- Rao, M. S. A. (1972). Tradition, rationality, and change: Essays in sociology of economic development and social change. Bombay: Popular Prakashan. OCLC 923035217.
- Rao, M. S. A., ed. (1974). Urban sociology in India: Reader and source book. New Delhi: Orient Blackswan. ISBN 978-0-86125-296-1.
- Rao, M. S. A. (1979). Social movements and social transformation: A study of two backward classes movements in India. Delhi: Macmillan. ISBN 978-0-333-90255-4.
- Rao, K. Ranga; Rao, M. S. A. (1984). Cities and slums: A study of a squatters' settlement in the city of Vijayawada. New Delhi: Concept. OCLC 898794953.
- Khare, R. S.; Rao, M. S. A. (1986). Food, society, and culture: Aspects in South Asian food systems. Durham, N. C.: Carolina Academic Press. ISBN 978-0-89089-275-6.
