= Ahir clans =

Caste of the Indian subcontinent

Ahir (Sanskrit: Abhira) is a caste found in the Indian subcontinent, mainly modern-day India, Nepal and Pakistan. The Ahir clans are spread almost all over country. Ahirs are also known as Yadav, a surname they adopted following Sanskritisation in the 20th century.

== Etymology ==
The word "ahir" is derived from the Sanskrit word "abhira."

== Clans ==
=== Nandvanshi Ahirs ===
The Nandvanshi Ahirs are a section of Ahirs. Kamarias are also a sub-clan of Nandvanshi Ahirs in Uttar Pradesh.

=== Gwalvanshi Ahirs ===
Gwalvanshi Ahirs have migrated to other parts of Uttar Pradesh from Mathura and they claim descent from gopis and gopas of Krishna's time.

=== Ghosi ===
The Ghosi are a division of Ahir community found mainly in North India. The Ghosis are found in both Hindu and Muslim religion. They were the zamidars and small rulers of various parts of country.

=== Phatak ===
The Phatak Ahirs claim to be descended from Digpal, the Ahir king of Mahaban.

=== Dauwa ===
In Bundelkhand, Dauwa Ahirs were allied with Bundela Rajputs and Dauwa women served as wetnurses for Bundela princes as part of a symbolic ritual.

=== Dhadhor ===
Dhadhor is a subcaste of Ahirs.

=== Krishnaut ===
Krishnaut or Kishnaut are Ahirs that inhabits the state of Bihar.

=== Majhraut ===
They inhabit the Indian states of Bihar and Jharkhand.

=== Sorathia ===
Sorathia is an Ahir clan found in the state of Gujarat in India. According to B.S Suryavanshi, they are the descendents of chief Rao Navaghana of Junagadh.
