= Ahir =

Social community of India

Ahir/Aheer
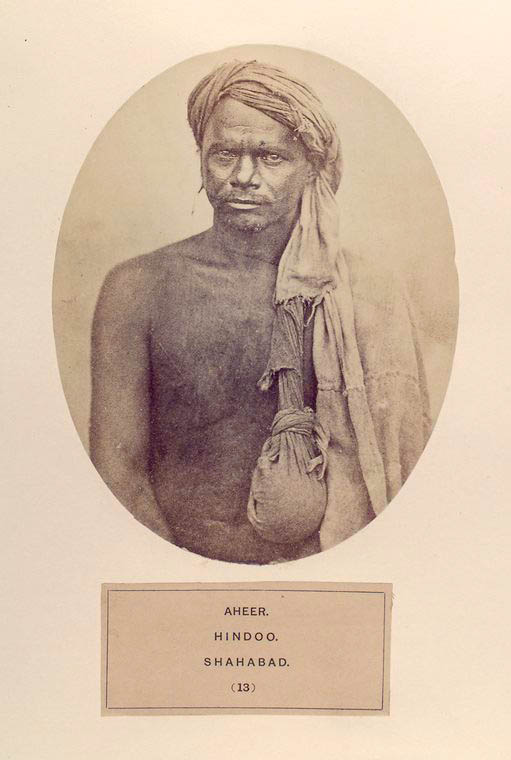
- An Aheer from Shahabad, Bihar
- Religions: Hinduism
- Languages: Varies depending on region
- Populated states: India and Nepal
- Subdivisions: Yaduvanshi Ahir; Nandvanshi Ahir; Gwalvanshi Ahir

Ahir or Aheer is a community of traditionally non-elite pastoralists in India, most of whom now use the Yadav surname, as they consider the two terms synonymous. The Ahirs are variously described as a caste, a clan, a race, and/or a tribe.

The traditional occupations of Ahirs are cattle-herding and agriculture. Since late 19th century to early 20th century, Ahirs have adopted Yadav word for their community and have claimed descent from the mythological king Yadu. This is a part of a movement of social and political resurgence (sanskritisation) under the influence of Arya Samaj.

Ahirs are found throughout India but are particularly concentrated in the northern area. Apart from India, Ahirs have significant population in Nepal, Mauritius, Fiji, South Africa and the Caribbean especially Guyana, Trinidad and Tobago, and Suriname. In Mauritius and Caribbean they are mostly the descendants of indentured servants who arrived in the 19th and 20th centuries from the former pre-partitioned sub-continent of India during the British Raj.

== Etymology ==
Ahir is believed to be a derivation of the Sanskrit word, "abhira", and the present term in the Bengali and Marathi languages is abhir.

== History ==
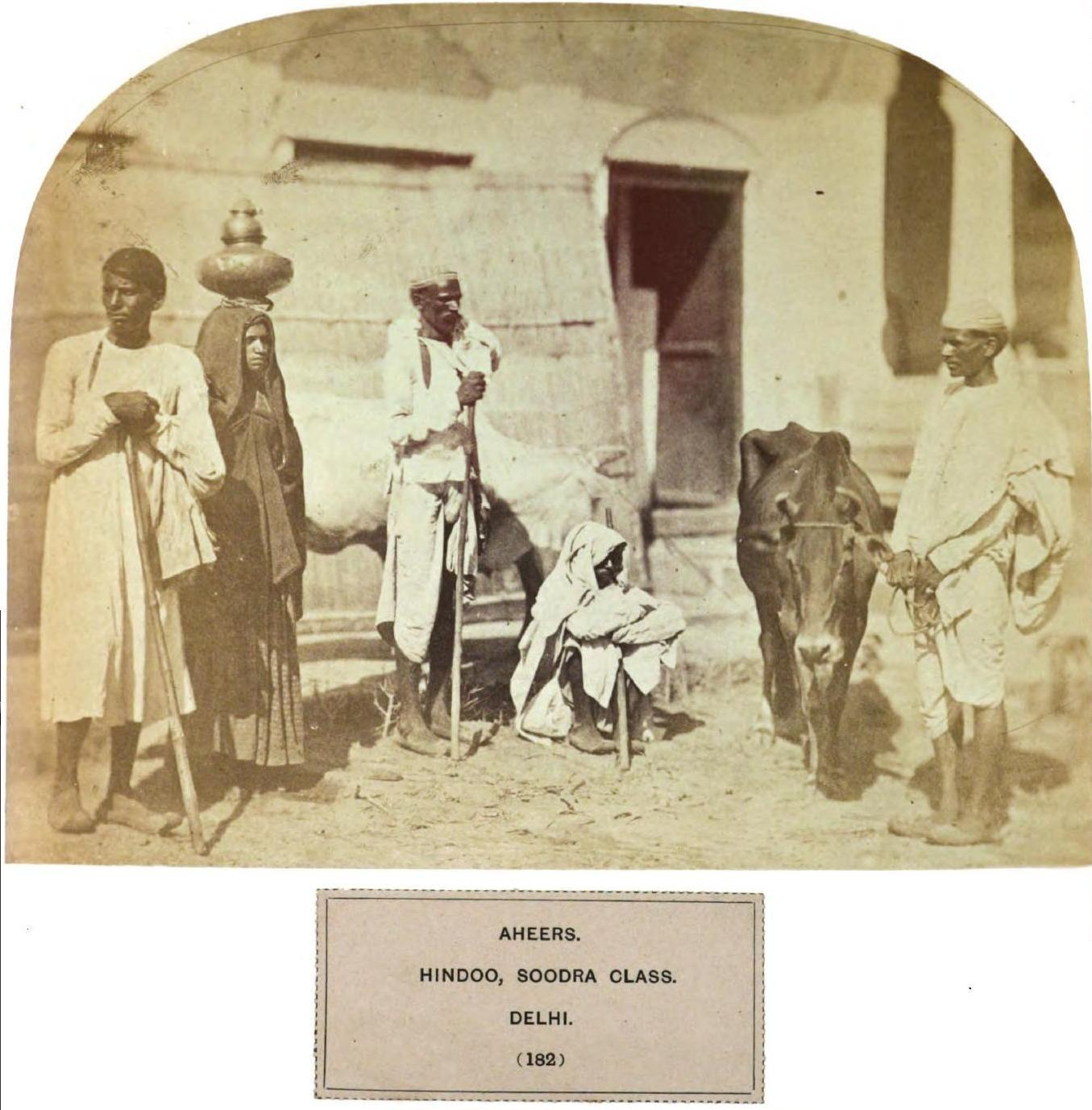
A group of Aheers, Delhi, 1868

=== Early history ===
Theories regarding the origins of the ancient Abhira – the putative ancestors of the Ahirs – are varied for the same reasons as are the theories regarding their location; that is, there is a reliance on interpretation of linguistic and factual analysis of old texts that are known to be unreliable and ambiguous.

Some, such as A. P. Karmakar, consider the Abhira to be a Proto-Dravidian tribe who migrated to India and point to the Puranas as evidence. Others, such as Sunil Kumar Bhattacharya, say that the Abhira are recorded as being in India in the 1st-century CE work, the Periplus of the Erythraean Sea. Bhattacharya considers the Abhira of old to be a race rather than a tribe. The sociologist M. S. A. Rao and historians such as P. M. Chandorkar and T. Padmaja say that epigraphical and historical evidence exists for equating the Ahirs with the ancient Yadava tribe.

Whether they were a race or a tribe, nomadic in tendency or displaced or part of a conquering wave, with origins in Indo-Scythia or Central Asia, Aryan or Dravidian – there is no academic consensus, and much in the differences of opinion relate to fundamental aspects of historiography, such as controversies regarding dating the writing of the Mahabharata and acceptance or otherwise of the Indo-Aryan migration (which is universally accepted in mainstream scholarship). (Note: Out of India aka Indigenous Aryans has no support: Romila Thapar (2006): "there is no scholar at this time seriously arguing for the indigenous origin of Aryans".; Wendy Doniger (2017): "The opposing argument, that speakers of Indo-European languages were indigenous to the Indian subcontinent, is not supported by any reliable scholarship. It is now championed primarily by Hindu nationalists, whose religious sentiments have led them to regard the theory of Aryan migration with some asperity."; Girish Shahane (September 14, 2019), in response to Narasimhan et al. (2019): "Hindutva activists, however, have kept the Aryan Invasion Theory alive, because it offers them the perfect strawman, 'an intentionally misrepresented proposition that is set up because it is easier to defeat than an opponent's real argument' ... The Out of India hypothesis is a desperate attempt to reconcile linguistic, archaeological and genetic evidence with Hindutva sentiment and nationalistic pride, but it cannot reverse time's arrow ... The evidence keeps crushing Hindutva ideas of history."; Koenraad Elst (May 10, 2016): "Of course it is a fringe theory, at least internationally, where the Aryan Invasion Theory (AIT) is still the official paradigm. In India, though, it has the support of most archaeologists, who fail to find a trace of this Aryan influx and instead find cultural continuity.") Similarly, there is no certainty regarding the occupational status of the Abhira, with ancient texts sometimes referring to them as pastoral and cowherders but at other times as robber tribes.

=== Kingdoms ===
- Ahir dynasty in pre-12th century areas in present-day Nepal
- Ahir-Rajas of Sagar
- Ahir Rajas of Gawror fort, Patna.

=== Military involvements ===
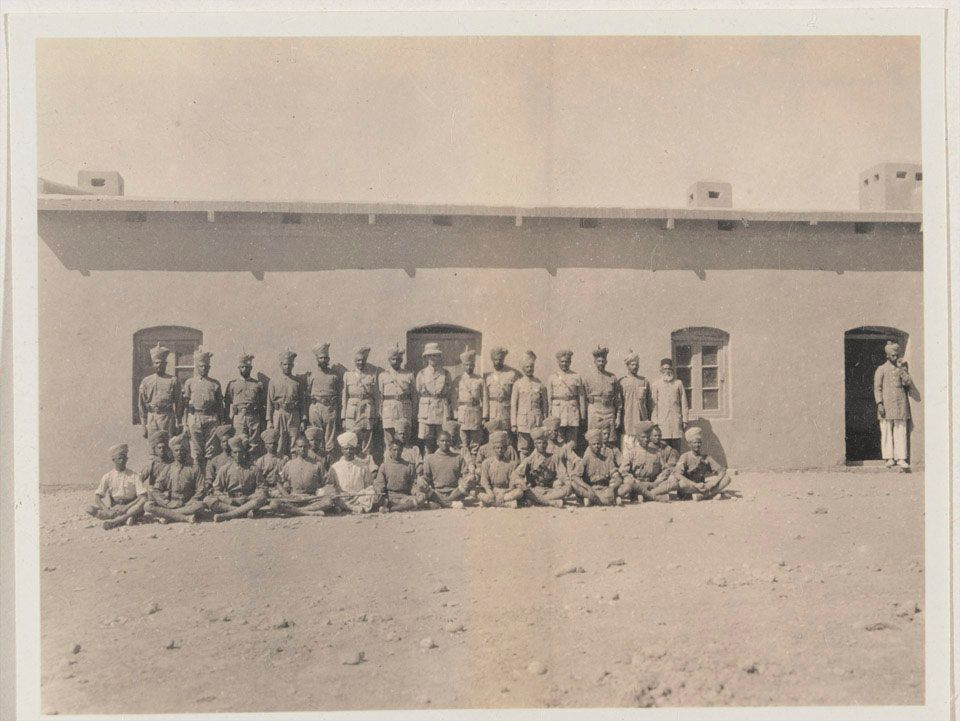
'B' Company (Ahir), 1st Battalion, The 5th Light Infantry, Quetta, 1918

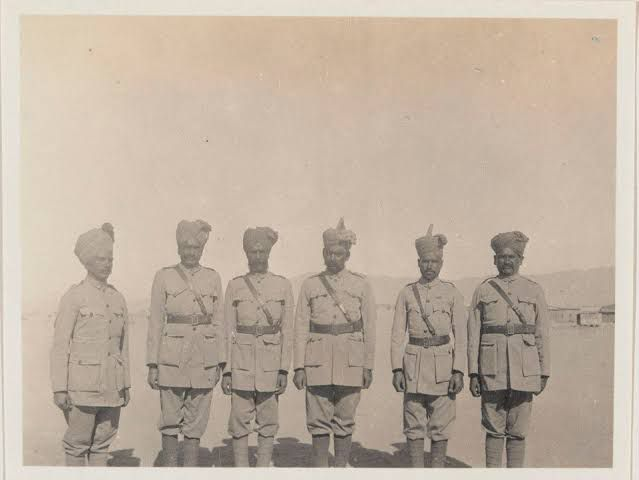
Indian officers, 'B' Company (Ahir), 1st Battalion, 5th Light Infantry, Quetta 1918.

The British rulers of India classified the Ahirs of Punjab as an "agricultural tribe" in the 1920s, which was at that time synonymous with being a "martial race". This was a designation created by administrators that classified each ethnic group as either "martial" or "non-martial": a "martial race" was typically considered brave and well built for fighting, whilst the remainder were those whom the British believed to be unfit for battle because of their sedentary lifestyles. However, the martial races were also considered politically subservient, intellectually inferior, lacking the initiative or leadership qualities to command large military formations. The British had a policy of recruiting the martial Indians from those who has less access to education as they were easier to control. According to modern historian Jeffrey Greenhunt on military history, "The Martial Race theory had an elegant symmetry. Indians who were intelligent and educated were defined as cowards, while those defined as brave were uneducated and backward". According to Amiya Samanta, the marital race was chosen from people of mercenary spirit (a soldier who fights for any group or country that will pay him/her), as these groups lacked nationalism as a trait. Ahirs had been recruited into the army from 1898. In that year, the British raised four Ahir companies, two of which were in the 95th Russell's Infantry. In post-independence India, some Ahir units have been involved in celebrated military actions, such as at Rezang La in the 1962 Sino-Indian War that saw the last stand of Charlie company, consisting of 114 Ahirs of 13 Kumaon, and in the 1965 India-Pakistan War.

== Sanskritisation ==
=== Recreating the past for new identity ===
It was from the 1920s that some Ahirs began to adopt the name of Yadav and created the Yadav Mahasabha, founded by ideologues such as Rajit Singh. Several caste histories and periodicals to trace a Kshatriya origin were written at the time, notably by Mannanlal Abhimanyu. These were part of the jostling among various castes for socio-economic status and ritual under the Raj and they invoked support for a zealous, martial Hindu ethos. Arya Samaj, a Hindu reformist organization also played an important role in ritual purification of Ahir/Yadavs and many low castes in order to incorporate them into Vedic Hinduism. In U.P, it was through shastrarth debates and with the help of reform movements like Arya Samaj and Vaishnava Ramanandi order in public debates that the Ahirs defended their claims to a higher social status. At the same time Ahir/Yadav intelligentsia also emphasized the socio-economic backwardness faced by their community and in 1927, a petition was sent to the Simon Commission describing how the Ahirs suffers from the same social disabilities and discrimination as the Chamars. Despite explicitly expressing their commitment against untouchability, it has been observed that these movements by Yadav caste associations have not been egalitarian enough to include communities who are under Scheduled Castes and have claimed connection with Krishna. Yadavs of Braj-Ahirwal attempted to "endlessly portray themselves" as inheritors of the heritage of local dynasties such as the Jats of Bharatpur and Alwar, Jadon Rajputs of Jaleshar and Karauli and fellow Ahir dynasties of Rewari and Mahabhan who were considered to be of Yaduvanshi descent.

=== Participation in reactionary communal conflicts ===
The Ahirs in Benaras, UP had been one of the more militant Hindu groups during pre-independent India. In one of the instances before independence, Hindu shudra caste groups as the Ahirs actively participated in a counter-reactionary communal conflict orchestrated by Arya Samaj. Some writers are also of the opinion that many low-castes (including Ahirs) took to cow protection for asserting higher status since cow already had symbolic importance in Hinduism. This view of cow protection was different from the UP's urban elites.

== Distribution ==
Photograph of a 1950 Bhatiya-Ahir assembly

Ahirs in India are known by numerous other names, including Gauli and Ghosi or Gop in North India. In Gujarat and South India as Ayar, Golla and Konar. Some in the Bundelkhand region of Uttar Pradesh are known as Dauwa. The Ahirs have more than 20 sub-castes.

=== North India ===
They have a significant population in the region around Behror, Alwar, Rewari, Narnaul, Mahendragarh, Gurgaon and Jhajjar – the region is therefore known as Ahirwal or the abode of Ahirs.

=== Maharashtra ===
Ahirani dialect continues to be spoken today in the region and is widespread across Jalgaon, Dhule and Nashik. It is an admixture of Marathi, Gujarati, Hindi, ancient Magadhi, Saurashtri, Sauraseni, Lati, Maharashtri, Prakrit and Paishachi.

== Culture ==
Ahir dancers decorated with cowrie shells for Diwali.

Ahir culture is rooted in pastoralism and closely associated to the worship of Krishna and Shiva. Through Sanskritization, the Ahirs adopted the modern-day ‘Yadav’ surname and linked themselves to the Yadu tribe by claiming descent from Yaduvanshi, Nandavanshi, and Goallavanshi, elevating their status within the caste hierarchy. (Note: Through Sanskritization, the Ahirs restructured its identity into three broad caste divisions for upliftment: Nandavanshi : Claim descent from Nanda, Krishna foster father, linking to Vrindavan pastoral traditions.; Yaduvanshi: Trace lineage to King Yadu, the legendary founder of the Yadava dynasty.; Goallavanshi: Originating from the Goala (cowherd) community, they associate with the Gopas and Gopis of Krishna childhood.)

=== Diet ===
In 1992, Noor Mohammad noted that most Ahirs in Uttar Pradesh were vegetarian, with some exceptions who were engaged in fishing and raising poultry.

=== Language and tradition ===
Ahirs of Benares speak a Hindi dialect which is different from one used normally. Ahirs usually speak the language of the region in which they live. Some languages/dialects named after Ahirs are Ahirani, also known as Khandeshi, spoken in Khandesh region of Maharashtra, Ahirwati spoken in Ahirwal region of Haryana and Rajasthan.

=== Folklore ===
The oral epic of Veer Lorik, a mythical Ahir hero, has been sung by folk singers in North India for generations. Mulla Daud, a Sufi Muslim, retold the romantic story in writing in the 14th century. Other Ahir folk traditions include those related to Kajri and Biraha.

== See also ==
- Ahir clans
- Ahir Regiment agitation
