= Manindra Kumar Mandal =

Indian politician

- Born: Murho, Madhepura, Bihar
- Occupations: Politician, Zamindar
- Known for: Member of Constituent Assembly
- Children: Nikhil Mandal

Manindra Kumar Mandal is an Indian politician and one of the scion of Murho Estate. He was elected from Madhepura assembly constituency in 2005. He is the son of former Bihar Chief Minister Babu B.P. Mandal, who headed the Mandal Commission.

== Biography ==
Manindra Kumar Mandal was born in a wealthy Yadav (Ahir) family, who were erstwhile zamindar of Murho Estate in Madhepura district of Bihar. He is the son of Babu B.P. Mandal and grandson of Babu Rash Bihari Lal Mandal, zamindar of Madhepura.

In 2005, Manindra contested and won the Madhepura assembly seat on a JDU ticket, however, JDU did not give him a ticket in the next election in 2010. A JD(U) leader revealed that party president Sharad Yadav was behind the decision.

== See also ==
- B.P. Mandal
- Rash Bihari Lal Mandal
- Madhepura Assembly constituency
