= Murho =

Village in Madhepura, Bihar, India

- Village
- Location in Bihar, India Murho (India)
- Coordinates: 25.8829798°N 86.8552048°E
- Country: India
- State: Bihar
- District: Madhepura
- Block: Madhepura

Population (2011)
  - Total: 8,040

Languages
  - Official: Hindi and Maithili
- Time zone: UTC+05:30 (IST)
- PIN: 852114
- Vehicle registration: BR-43

Murho is a village in the Madhepura block of Madhepura district, in the Indian state of Bihar. It is part of the Kosi division and is located near Madhepura town. As per the 2011 Census of India, the village had a population of 8,040 across 1,599 households.

== Geography ==
Murho lies in the floodplain region associated with the Kosi river system and forms part of Madhepura tehsil. The village is linked by district roads to Madhepura town and neighbouring villages, providing access to local markets and services.

== Demographics ==
As per the 2011 Census of India, Murho comprised 1,599 households with a total population of 8,040 (4,240 males and 3,800 females). Children aged 0–6 numbered 1,603. The average sex ratio was 896 and the child sex ratio was 870. Overall literacy in the village was 54.22% (male literacy 62.55%; female literacy 44.99%). Scheduled Caste population constituted approximately 27.86% of the total.

== Economy ==
According to the 2011 census data, out of 2,174 total workers in Murho, 1,851 were classified as main workers. Among main workers, 979 were cultivators (owners or co-owners) and 760 worked as agricultural labourers, indicating that agriculture is the primary occupation in the village.

== Education ==
The village's literacy rate (54.22% in 2011) is below the Bihar state average (61.80%). Specific information on local schools and other educational institutions may be added when reliable sources are available.

== Transport ==
Murho is accessible by local district roads connecting to Madhepura town. The nearest railway station serving the area is Budhma (station code: BDMA).

== Postal services ==
The Murho branch office (Murho B.O.) in Madhepura uses the PIN code 852114.

== See also ==
- Murho Estate
