= Yadavs in Bihar =

Indian caste

Bihari Yadav
- Religions: Hindu
- Languages: Hindi, Bhojpuri, Bajjika, Magahi, Maithili & Angika
- Original state: Bihar
- Region: East India

Yadavs in Bihar refers to the people of Yadav community of the Indian state of Bihar. They are also known by other names such as Ahir The Yadavs form nearly 14.26% of the state's population and are included in the Other Backward Class category in the Bihar state of India.

== Origin and history ==
=== Origin ===
In the 1931 census of India, the Ahirs and several other pastoral and cow-keeping communities such as Goalas and Gopas began to adopt the collective identity of Yadav or Yadubansi, claiming descent from the ancient Yadu tribe. Anthropologist J. H. Hutton said that this process involved an attempt to project a noble origin, which he described as "of extremely doubtful authenticity".

=== History ===
The Ahir tribe was the dominant group in the Bihar section of the Gangetic valley during the later prehistoric period. The Ahiri country extended from around Banaras eastward to the Kosi River, primarily lying north of the Ganges.

==== List of dynasties, chieftaincy and zamindari ====
In Bihar, there were many zamindars belonging to Yadav (Ahir) community. These zamindars belonged to the difficult geographical regions, mostly diara land of the rivers. In the diara regions their rule continued with the help of their militia.

- Rati Raut, an Ahir chief of Rati Paragana in north Bihar.
- Daso Ahir, Raja of Bhojpur.
- Ahir chief of Ruidas-Patna.
- Ahir Rajas of Gawror Fort, Patna.
- Ahir chieftain of Murho Estate (Madhepura).
- Kishnaut Ahir zamindars of Parasadi Estate and Parsauna (Saran).
- Babu Girwar Narayan Mandal, Zamindar of Ranipatti (Madhepura).
- Zamindars of Pipra estate in erstwhile Munger district (Now in Shambhuganj block of Banka district, Bihar).
- Kanaujia Ahir landlords of Mohan Tola, Saran, Bihar.

=== Occupation ===
At one time the main occupation of the Yadavs of Bihar was rearing cattle, but now most of them are cultivator.

== Culture ==
=== Caste deities ===
In Kosi division of Bihar, people of the Yadav caste worship their caste deity Bisu Raut, whose temple is situated on the banks of the Gogri river. Baba Karu Khirhari, who was born among Yadavs, is another folk god revered by people not only in Kosi but also in the parts of Nepal. His temple is located in Mahpura village of Saharsa district.

Gobanai Baba is worshipped by Ahir families of Darbhanga district. His temple is situated in village Mahulia.

== Politics ==
Around 1933–1934, the Yadavs joined with the Kurmis and Koeris to form the Triveni Sangh, a caste federation that by 1936 claimed to have a million supporters. This coalition followed an alliance for the 1930 local elections which fared badly at the polls. The new grouping had little electoral success: it won a few seats in the 1937 elections but was stymied by a two-pronged opposition which saw the rival Congress wooing some of its more wealthy leading lights to a newly formed unit called the "Backward Class Federation" and an effective opposition from upper castes organised to keep the lower castes in their customary place. Added to this, the three putatively allied castes were unable to set aside their communal rivalries and the Triveni Sangh also faced competition from the All India Kisan Sabha, a peasant-oriented socio-political campaigning group run by the Communists. The appeal of the Triveni Sangh had waned significantly by 1947 but had achieved a measure of success away from the ballot box, notably by exerting sufficient influence to bring an end to the begar system of forced unpaid labour and by providing a platform for those voices seeking reservation of jobs in government for people who were not upper castes. Many years later, in 1965, there was an abortive attempt to revive the defunct federation.

In the post Mandal phase Kurmi, Koeri and Yadav, the three backward castes who constitute the upper-OBC due to their advantageous position in the socio-economic sphere of agrarian society became the new political elite of the state.

== Notable people ==
=== Politics ===
- B.P. Mandal, ex-CM of Bihar.
- Bali Ram Bhagat, ex-Speaker of Lok Sabha and MP.
- Bhupendra Narayan Mandal, Indian politician
- Daroga Prasad Rai, ex-CM of Bihar.
- Hukumdev Narayan Yadav, Indian politician
- Lalu Prasad Yadav, ex-CM of Bihar.
- Nityanand Rai, BJP leader, Union Minister of State for Home Affairs.
- Pappu Yadav, Independent MP from Purnia.
- Ram Lakhan Singh Yadav, former MP
- Ram Jaipal Singh Yadav, ex-Deputy CM of Bihar.
- Rabri Devi, ex-CM of Bihar.
- Tejashwi Yadav, ex-Deputy CM of Bihar.
- Tej Pratap Yadav, former Cabinet Minister and MLA.

=== Military ===
- Air Marshal AK Bharti

=== Others ===
- Rash Bihari Lal Mandal, zamindar of Madhepura, philanthropist and leader of freedom movement.

== See also ==
- Ahir
- Ahir clans
