= Mandal (surname) =

Indic surname

- Pronunciation: man-dal mon-dol

Origin
- Meaning: Circle
- Region of origin: Bangladesh; India; Nepal

Other names
- Variant forms: Mondal, Mondol

Mandal, also spelled Mondal or Mondol, is an honorific title that was used for local chieftains in present-day Bangladesh, India and Nepal. The title was usually hereditary and so, in modern times, the term is a common surname for both males and females.

== Meaning ==
The word "mandal" has various meanings depending upon the context, such as circle, orb, disc, ring, sphere, globe, orbit, province, assemblage or zone. A mandal was an administrative circle under a district or revenue division, similar to a tehsil, in many parts of South Asia. Originally this honorary title was given to the Administrator of provincial government. 'Mukhiya' or headman of a village was also conferred with this title. Sometimes this designation meant the person who as a representative of the Zamindar used to distribute land and also collect the revenue.

== Class and community ==
For the upper classes in Bengal, family surnames date from the arrival of the British in the eighteenth century or earlier. Gregory Clark found Mandal as one of the common surnames among petitioners to the East India Company courts. Sudarshana Bhaumik noted Mandal was one of the titles among Aguri feudal lords. In some parts of Bengal, especially in Bankura, few Brahmins use Mondal surname. Lokeshwar Basu noticed Mandal surname among a section of Kayastha and Suvarna Banik. Mondal surname is commonly found among trading and peasant communities like Baishya Saha, Mahishya, Sadgop, Tili and some OBC castes. Mandal is also a Scheduled Castes surname, many from which has now become "social elite", according to Clark. It is also in vogue among Bengali Muslims and some Christians.

In Bihar, Dhanuk, Gangota, Kurmi, Kushwaha and Yadav communities, and in Orissa some Karan use this surname.

== Notable people ==
=== A ===
- Abhijit Mondal (born 1978), Indian footballer
- Abhra Mondal (born 1986), Indian goalkeeper coach
- Abu Saeed Muhammad Omar Ali Mandal (1919–2012), Bangladeshi Islamic scholar and translator
- Anil Kumar Mandal, Indian ophthalmologist and Shanti Swarup Bhatnagar Prize winner
- Anil Mandal, Nepalese Cricketer, first batsman to score an International Century
- Anil Mondal, Indian weightlifter, competed at the 1972 Summer Olympics and the 1976 Summer Olympics
- Anubrata Mondal, Indian politician
- Arnab Mondal (born 1989), Indian footballer
- Arunoday Mondal, Indian physician, Padma Shri awardee, popularly known as "Sundarbaner Sujan"

=== B ===
- Bina Mondal, Indian politician
- Bindheshwari Prasad Mandal (1918–1982), Indian parliamentarian who headed the Mandal Commission

=== C ===
- Chitra Mandal, Indian chemical biologist
- Chitra Sen nee Mandal, Indian actress

=== D ===
- Deepak Mondal, Indian footballer and Arjuna Award winner
- Dilip Mondal, Indian politician and state minister

=== E ===
- Eugenia Mandal, Polish social psychologist

=== G ===
- Gopal Mandal, Bihari politician

=== H ===
- Habibur Rehman Mondal (born 1986), Indian professional footballer
- Hira Mondal (born 1996), Indian footballer

=== J ===
- Jayden Mandal (born 2005), American football player
- Joyita Mondal, India's first transgender judge and social worker from West Bengal

=== K ===
- Kamal Hasan Mondal (born 1982), Indian cricketer
- Khitish Chandra Mondal, Bangladeshi politician and former minister

=== L ===
- Lal Behari Dey Mandal, Indian author and Journalist
- Lata Mondal (born 1993), Bangladeshi cricketer

=== M ===
- Manas Kumar Mandal, Indian psychologist
- Mohammad Hossain Mondol (1935–2018), director-general of Bangladesh Agricultural Research Institute
- Monidipa Mimi Mondal, Indian speculative fiction writer

=== N ===
- Nibir Mandal, Indian geologist and Shanti Swarup Bhatnagar Prize winner

=== P ===
- Phanishwar Nath Mandal (1921–1977), one of the most influential writers of modern Hindi literature
- Pratima Mondal (born 1966), Indian politician

=== R ===
- Rabin Mondal, Indian artist and founding member of Calcutta painters
- Rash Bihari Lal Mandal, Indian Zamindar and Indian Indian independence activists
- Ripon Mondol (born 2003), Bangladeshi cricketer

=== S ===
- Samir Mondal (born 1952), Indian painter, credited with revival of watercolor painting
- Sanchari Mondal, Indian actress
- Satya Narayan Mandal, Nepalese politician and former minister
- Sayan Mondal (born 1989), Indian cricketer
- Soma Mondal, first ever female chairperson of Steel Authority of India Limited
- Shashwati Mandal, Hindustani Classical music vocalist
- Shivnandan Prasad Mandal, Freedom fighter and politician
- Shyama Prasad Mandal, Indian orthopaedic surgeon and Padma Shri awardee
- Shyamal Mondal, Indian politician and former minister of state
- Sujit Mondal, Indian script writer, story writer, film director
- Swadhin Kumar Mandal, Indian Chemist and Shanti Swarup Bhatnagar Prize for Science and Technology awardee

== Families ==
- Bawali Mondal Family, a major Zamindar family from 24 Parganas of West Bengal
- Family of President Ziaur Rahman Mandal of Bangladesh
- Murho zamindar family, an Ahir (Yadav) zamindar family from Bhagalpur

== Fictional characters ==
- Tara Mandal, character in the British soap opera Coronation Street

== See also ==
- Mandala
- Mandala (political model)
- Rajamandala
- Sand mandala
- Sher Mandal
- Jotedar
