= 1977 Indian general election in Bihar =

Election in Bihar

54 seats to the Lok Sabha
	First party	Second party
Party	Janata Party	INC
Seats won	52	0

This is a list of successful candidates from constituencies in Bihar in the 1977 general elections to the 5th Lok Sabha, the lower house of the parliament of India.

== Results by Party ==
Party Name	Popular vote			Seats		
Party Name	Votes	%	±pp	Contested	Won	+/−
JP / BLD	1,35,63,737	64.98	New entry	52	52	New entry
INC	47,81,142	22.90	▼17.16	54	0	▼39
CPI	11,75,153	5.63	▼4.22	22	0	▼5
JHKP	1,26,288	0.60	▼0.31	1	1	Steady
CPI(M)	42,042	0.20	▼0.56	2	0	Steady
Others	2,25,872	1.08	Steady	21	0	Steady
IND	9,60,672	4.60	▼4.51	188	1	Steady
Total	2,08,74,906	100%	-	340	54	-

== Results by Constituency ==
Constituency			Winner				Runner Up				Margin	%
#	Name	Poll %	Candidate	Party	Votes	%	Candidate	Party	Votes	%	Margin	%
1	Bagaha (SC)	46.51%	Jagannath Prasad	JP	138,443	50.43	Bhola Raut	INC	97,755	35.61	40,688	14.82
2	Bettiah	50.38%	Fazlur Rahman	JP	186,486	58.74	Kedar Pandey	INC	90,158	28.40	96,328	30.34
3	Motihari	55.63%	Thakur Ramapati Singh	JP	167,732	46.71	Bibhuti Mishra	INC	93,779	26.11	73,953	20.60
4	Gopalganj	63.11%	Dwarka Nath Tiwary	JP	294,466	70.08	Abdul Ghafoor	INC	121,474	28.91	172,992	41.17
5	Siwan	67.34%	Mrityunjay Prasad	JP	325,030	74.87	Mohamad Yusuf	INC	93,954	21.64	231,076	53.23
6	Maharajganj	65.70%	Ramdeo Singh	JP	345,781	77.96	Daroga Prasad Roy	INC	93,883	21.17	251,898	56.79
7	Chapra	73.89%	Lalu Prasad Yadav	JP	415,409	85.97	Ram Shekhar Prasad Singh	INC	41,609	8.61	373,800	77.36
8	Hajipur (SC)	77.07%	Ram Vilas Paswan	JP	469,007	89.30	Baleshwar Ram	INC	44,462	8.47	424,545	80.83
9	Vaishali	76.10%	Digvijay Narain Singh	JP	435,757	85.03	Nawal Kishore Singh	INC	70,260	13.71	365,497	71.32
10	Muzaffarpur	75.95%	George Fernandes	JP	396,687	78.23	Nitishwer Prasad Singh	INC	62,470	12.32	334,217	65.91
11	Sitamarhi	69.81%	Shyam Sunder Das	JP	261,321	52.49	Nagendra Prasad Yadav	INC	171,227	34.39	90,094	18.10
12	Sheohar	62.18%	Thakur Girjanandan Singh	JP	241,672	56.31	Hari Kishore Singh	INC	174,643	40.69	67,029	15.62
13	Madhubani	68.40%	Hukmdev Narayan Yadav	JP	200,543	42.86	Bhogendra Jha	CPI	143,422	30.65	57,121	12.21
14	Jhanjharpur	74.71%	Dhanik Lal Mandal	JP	305,554	65.78	Jagannath Mishra	INC	148,073	31.88	157,481	33.90
15	Darbhanga	66.42%	Surendra Jha Suman	JP	306,857	73.57	Radhanandan Jha	INC	94,855	22.74	212,002	50.83
16	Rosera (SC)	69.07%	Ram Sewak Hazari	JP	311,240	70.70	Ram Bhagat Paswan	INC	116,734	26.52	194,506	44.18
17	Samastipur	70.69%	Karpoori Thakur	JP	401,935	78.22	Yamuna Prasad Mandal	INC	74,501	14.50	327,434	63.72
18	Barh	72.02%	Shyam Sunder Gupta	JP	372,227	75.94	Dharamvir Singh	INC	101,945	20.80	270,282	55.14
19	Balia	59.92%	Ramajiwan Singh	JP	146,772	39.25	Surya Narayan Singh	CPI	99,140	26.51	47,632	12.74
20	Saharsa	68.08%	Vinayak Prasad Yadav	JP	306,994	67.35	Chiranjib Jha	INC	118,288	25.95	188,706	41.40
21	Madhepura	71.58%	B. P. Mandal	JP	301,076	65.44	Rajendra Prasad Yadav	INC	100,359	21.81	200,717	43.63
22	Araria (SC)	58.86%	Mahendra Narayan Sardar	JP	221,829	65.36	Dumar Lal Baitha	INC	113,295	33.38	108,534	31.98
23	Kishanganj	48.91%	Halimuddin Ahmed	JP	168,175	58.58	Jamilur Rahman	INC	88,045	30.67	80,130	27.91
24	Purnea	59.73%	Lakhan Lal Kapoor	JP	199,034	56.07	Madhuri Singh	INC	106,997	30.14	92,037	25.93
25	Katihar	60.17%	Yuvraj	JP	215,074	69.41	Tariq Anwar	INC	85,285	27.52	129,789	41.89
26	Rajmahal (ST)	39.95%	Anthony Murmu	JP	148,677	68.15	Yofesh Chandra Murmu	INC	56,191	25.76	92,486	42.39
27	Dumka (ST)	41.42%	Bateshwar Hemram	JP	115,386	49.45	Prithiwichand Kisku	INC	62,132	26.63	53,254	22.82
28	Godda	57.91%	Jagadambi Prasad Yadav	JP	250,749	70.01	Jagdish N. Mandal	INC	91,758	25.62	158,991	44.39
29	Banka	55.14%	Madhu Limaye	JP	239,550	71.14	Chandra Shekhar Singh	INC	78,866	23.42	160,684	47.72
30	Bhagalpur	63.65%	Dr. Ramji Singh	JP	304,791	71.74	Bhagalpur	INC	120,073	28.26	184,718	43.48
31	Khagaria	63.14%	Gyaneshwar Prasad Yadav	JP	230,687	57.22	Jai N. Mehta	INC	81,395	20.19	149,292	37.03
32	Monghyr	74.00%	Shri Krishna Singh	JP	337,791	66.15	Devendra Prasad Yadav	INC	164,174	32.15	173,617	34.00
33	Begusarai	63.22%	Shyam Nandan Mishra	JP	185,382	44.48	Tarkeshri Sinha	INC	150,154	36.03	35,228	8.45
34	Nalanda	71.63%	Birendra Prasad	JP	284,684	54.06	Vijay Kumar Yadav	CPI	143,662	27.28	141,022	26.78
35	Patna	68.02%	Maha Maya Prasad Sinha	JP	382,363	76.61	Ramavatar Shastri	CPI	59,238	11.87	323,125	64.74
36	Arrah	65.00%	Chandradeo Prasad Verma	JP	323,913	70.67	Baliram Bhagat	INC	113,036	24.66	210,877	46.01
37	Buxar	63.38%	Rama Nand Tiwary	JP	286,418	65.04	Anant Prasad Sharma	INC	82,705	18.78	203,713	46.26
38	Sasaram (SC)	64.98%	Jagjivan Ram	JP	327,995	78.49	Mungeri Lall	INC	84,185	20.15	243,810	58.34
39	Bikramganj	61.39%	Ram Awadhesh Singh	JP	248,578	59.57	Ram Subhag Singh	INC	96,827	23.21	151,751	36.36
40	Aurangabad	61.44%	Satyendra Narain Singh	JP	251,139	61.76	Ram Swaroop Yadav	INC	130,692	32.14	120,447	29.62
41	Jahanabad	66.44%	Hari Lal Prasad Sinha	JP	317,954	64.85	Chandrika Prasad Yadav	INC	66,984	13.66	250,970	51.19
42	Nawada (SC)	69.87%	Nathuni Ram	JP	429,785	84.00	Mahabir Chaudhary	INC	67,084	13.11	362,701	70.89
43	Gaya (SC)	69.29%	Ishwar Chaudhry	JP	341,000	77.60	Mishri Sada	INC	92,682	21.09	248,318	56.51
44	Chatra	47.97%	Sukdeo Prasad Verma	JP	203,878	74.99	Shankar Dayal Singh	INC	60,344	22.19	143,534	52.80
45	Kodarma	43.38%	Ritlal Prasad Verma	JP	169,387	67.34	Chaplendu Bhattacharyyia	INC	53,359	21.21	116,028	46.13
46	Giridih	50.03%	Ram Das Singh	JP	164,120	58.35	I. Ahmad	INC	85,843	30.52	78,277	27.83
47	Dhanbad	45.39%	A. K. Roy	IND	205,495	68.74	Ram Narain Sharma	INC	63,646	21.29	141,849	47.45
48	Hazaribagh	47.73%	Basant Narain Singh	JP	186,058	64.67	Damodar Pandey	INC	44,941	15.62	141,117	49.05
49	Ranchi	47.84%	Ravindra Verma	JP	130,938	49.02	Sheo Prasad Sahu	INC	68,222	25.54	62,716	23.48
50	Jamshedpur	46.85%	Rudra Pratap Sarangi	JP	131,419	50.16	V. G. Gopal	INC	67,666	25.83	63,753	24.33
51	Singhbhum (ST)	34.46%	Bagun Sumbrai	JKP	126,288	73.31	Moran Singh Purty	INC	24,422	14.18	101,866	59.13
52	Khunti (ST)	33.93%	Kariya Munda	JP	91,859	49.99	Nirel Mundu	JKP	56,976	31.01	34,883	18.98
53	Lohardaga (ST)	45.74%	Laloo Oraon	JP	142,274	56.93	Kartik Oraon	INC	77,391	30.97	64,883	25.96
54	Palamau (SC)	45.80%	Ramdeni Ram	JP	201,861	77.56	Kamla Kumari	INC	39,022	14.99	162,839	62.57

== Post-election Union Council of Ministers from Bihar ==
#	Name	Constituency	Designation	Department	From	To	Party
1	Jagjivan Ram	Sasaram (SC)	Cabinet Minister	Defence	28 March 1977	28 July 1979	JP
1	Jagjivan Ram	Sasaram (SC)	Deputy Prime Minister		24 January 1979	28 July 1979	JP
2	George Fernandes	Muzaffarpur	Cabinet Minister	Communications	27 March 1977	6 July 1977	JP
2	George Fernandes	Muzaffarpur	Cabinet Minister	Industry	6 July 1977	15 July 1979	JP
3	Ravindra Varma	Ranchi	Cabinet Minister	Parliamentary Affairs	26 March 1977	28 July 1979	JP
3	Ravindra Varma	Ranchi	Cabinet Minister	Labour	26 March 1977	28 July 1979	JP
4	Shyam Nandan Prasad Mishra	Begusarai	Cabinet Minister	External Affairs	28 July 1979	14 January 1980	JP(S)
4	Shyam Nandan Prasad Mishra	Begusarai	Cabinet Minister	Communications	7 December 1979	14 January 1980	JP(S)
5	Fazlur Rahman	Bettiah	Cabinet Minister	Labour	30 July 1979	14 January 1980	JP(S)
5	Fazlur Rahman	Bettiah	Cabinet Minister	Muslim Waqfs	7 December 1979	14 January 1980	JP(S)
6	Dhanik Lal Mandal	Jhanjharpur	MoS	Home Affairs	30 July 1979	14 January 1980	JP(S)
