= Siripur, Madhepura =

Village in Bihar, India

Siripur
- Village
- Location within Bihar Location within India
- Coordinates: 25°59′55″N 86°57′57″E
- Country: India
- State: Bihar
- District: Madhepura
- Block: Kumarkhand

Government
  - Type: Sarpanch

Area
  - Total: 39.2 km^{2} (15.1 sq mi)
- Elevation: 52 m (171 ft)

Population (2011)
  - Total: 31,628
  - Density: 807/km^{2} (2,090/sq mi)

Languages
  - Local: Maithili
- Time zone: UTC+5:30 (IST)
- PIN: 852112
- STD code: 06476
- Vehicle registration: BR-43

Siripur is a village in Kumarkhand block in Madhepura district of Bihar state, India. It is located 19 kilometres northeast of the district headquarter Madhepura. Siripur is among the largest villages in Kumarkhand block, with a population of 31,628 as per the 2011 census.

== Geography ==
Siripur is situated in lands between the National Highway 327 and 231. It covers an area of 3920 hectares.

== Demographics ==
At the end of 2011, the village had a population of 31,628, of whom 16,503 were male and 15,125 were female. The working population composed 46.74% of the overall population. The literacy rate was 40.02%, with 7,915 of the male inhabitants and 4,741 of the female inhabitants being literate.
