= Madhepura subdivision =

Administrative subdivision in Madhepura district, Bihar, India

- Subdivision
- Location in Bihar, India Madhepura subdivision (India)
- Coordinates: 25.9156433°N 86.7890270°E
- Country: India
- State: Bihar
- Division: Kosi
- District: Madhepura district

Area
  - Total: 147 km^{2} (57 sq mi)

Population (2011)
  - Total: 245,847
  - Density: 1,670/km^{2} (4,330/sq mi)
- Time zone: UTC+05:30 (IST)

Madhepura subdivision is an administrative subdivision of Madhepura district in Kosi division, Bihar, India. Its administrative headquarters is located at Madhepura. The subdivision covers an area of approximately 147 square kilometres and had a population of 245,847 as per the 2011 Census of India.

== History ==
Madhepura functioned as a subdivision during the colonial period. In 1981, Madhepura district was created, and the present-day Madhepura subdivision continued as one of its two administrative subdivisions.

== Administrative composition ==
Madhepura district consists of two subdivisions: Madhepura subdivision and Udakishunganj subdivision. The official district portal and the Integrated Government Online Directory (IGOD) list the Community Development (C.D.) blocks under Madhepura subdivision.

The following blocks are administered under Madhepura subdivision:

- Madhepura (C.D. Block)
- Singheshwar (C.D. Block)
- Murliganj (C.D. Block)
- Gamharia (C.D. Block)
- Ghailar (C.D. Block)
- Kumarkhand (C.D. Block)
- Shankarpur (C.D. Block)
- Chausa (C.D. Block)
- Puraini (C.D. Block)

== Geography ==
The subdivision lies in the alluvial plains of the Kosi River basin. The soil is fertile and suitable for agriculture. The climate is humid subtropical, with hot summers, monsoon rainfall between June and September, and cool winters.

== Demographics ==
According to the 2011 Census of India, the total population of Madhepura subdivision was 245,847. Detailed village- and block-level data are available in the District Census Handbook.

== Governance ==
The subdivision is administered by a Sub-Divisional Officer (SDO), who oversees revenue administration, law and order, and implementation of development schemes.

== See also ==
- Madhepura district
- Madhepura
- Udakishunganj subdivision
- Kosi division
