= Madhepura Assembly constituency =

Coordinates: 25°55′01″N 86°46′53″E

Madhepura
- Constituency No. 73 for the Bihar Legislative Assembly

Constituency details
- Country: India
- Region: East India
- State: Bihar
- District: Madhepura
- Lok Sabha constituency: 13. Madhepura
- Established: 1957
- Total electors: 345,596
- Reservation: None

Member of Legislative Assembly
- 18th Bihar Legislative Assembly
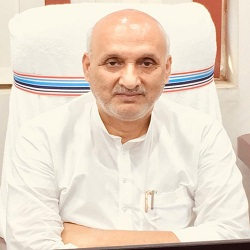
- Incumbent Chandrashekhar Yadav
- Party: RJD
- Alliance: MGB
- Elected year: 2025

Madhepura Assembly constituency is an assembly constituency in Madhepura district in the Indian state of Bihar. In 2015 Bihar Legislative Assembly election, Madhepura will be one of the 36 seats to have VVPAT enabled electronic voting machines.

== Overview ==
As per Delimitation of Parliamentary and Assembly constituencies Order, 2008, No. 73 Madhepura Assembly constituency is composed of the following: Madhepura, Ghamharia and Ghailadh community development blocks; Belo, Nadhi, Jitapur, Bhatkhora, Tamot Parsa and Parwa Navtol gram panchayats of Murliganj CD Block.

Madhepura Assembly constituency is part of No. 13 Madhepura (Lok Sabha constituency) .

== Members of the Legislative Assembly ==
| Year | Member | Party |
|---|---|---|
| 1957 | Bhupendra Narayan Mandal | Independent |
| 1962 | Bindeshwari Prasad Mandal | Indian National Congress |
| 1967 | M.P. Yadav | Samyukta Socialist Party |
| 1969 | Bholi Prasad Mandal | Indian National Congress |
| 1972 | Bindeshwari Prasad Mandal | Samyukta Socialist Party |
| 1977 | Radha Kant Yadav | Janata Party |
| 1980 | Radha Kant Yadav | Janata Party (Secular) |
| 1985 | Bholi Prasad Mandal | Indian National Congress |
| 1985^ | Rajendra Prasad Yadav | Indian National Congress |
| 1990 | Radha Kant Yadav | Janata Dal |
| 1995 | Parameshwari Prasad Nirala | Janata Dal |
| 2000 | Rajendra Prasad Yadav | Rashtriya Janata Dal |
| 2005 | Manindra Kumar Mandal | Janata Dal (United) |
| 2005 | Manindra Kumar Mandal | Janata Dal (United) |
| 2010 | Chandrashekhar Yadav | Rashtriya Janata Dal |
| 2015 | Chandrashekhar Yadav | Rashtriya Janata Dal |
| 2020 | Chandrashekhar Yadav | Rashtriya Janata Dal |
| 2025 | Chandrashekhar Yadav | Rashtriya Janata Dal |

^By-election

== Election results ==
=== 2025 ===
2025 Bihar Legislative Assembly election: Madhepura
| Party | Candidate | Votes | % | ±% |
|---|---|---|---|---|
| RJD | Chandrashekhar Yadav | 108,464 | 45.27 | ▲5.75 |
| JD(U) | Kavita Kumari Saha | 100,655 | 42.01 | ▲10.31 |
| Independent | Pranav Prakash | 7,894 | 3.29 | |
| JSP | Shashi Kumar | 4,634 | 1.93 | |
| AAP | Mukesh Kumar | 3,652 | 1.52 | |
| Independent | Sanjay Kumar | 2,819 | 1.18 | |
| NOTA | None of the above | 5,828 | 2.43 | ▲1.77 |
| Majority | | 7,809 | 3.26 | ▼4.56 |
| Turnout | | 239,590 | 69.33 | ▲7.27 |
| RJD hold | | Swing | | |

=== 2020 ===
2020 Bihar Legislative Assembly election: Madhepura
| Party | Candidate | Votes | % | ±% |
|---|---|---|---|---|
| RJD | Chandrashekhar Yadav | 81,116 | 39.52 | −10.0 |
| JD(U) | Nikhil Mandal | 65,070 | 31.7 | |
| JAP(L) | Pappu Yadav | 26,591 | 12.96 | +9.24 |
| LJP | Saakar Suresh Yadav | 6,356 | 3.1 | |
| Independent | Shashi Kumar | 5,566 | 2.71 | |
| Independent | Vikram Kumar | 4,295 | 2.09 | |
| Independent | Lalan Kumar | 2,828 | 1.38 | |
| Independent | Lalo Rishidev | 1,979 | 0.96 | |
| NOTA | None of the above | 1,352 | 0.66 | −0.92 |
| Majority | | 16,046 | 7.82 | −12.67 |
| Turnout | | 205,250 | 62.06 | +1.85 |
| RJD hold | | Swing | | |

=== 2015 ===
2015 Bihar Legislative Assembly election: Madhepura
| Party | Candidate | Votes | % | ±% |
|---|---|---|---|---|
| RJD | Chandrashekhar Yadav | 90,974 | 49.52 | |
| BJP | Vijay Kumar | 53,332 | 29.03 | |
| JAP(L) | Ashok Kumar | 6,833 | 3.72 | |
| Independent | Jyoti Mandal | 4,386 | 2.39 | |
| Independent | Ala Udin | 3,605 | 1.96 | |
| Independent | Vishal Kumar | 2,839 | 1.55 | |
| CPI(M) | Ganesh Manav | 2,549 | 1.39 | |
| BSP | Kapildev Paswan | 2,323 | 1.26 | |
| Hind Congress Party | Vinod Kumar | 2,224 | 1.21 | |
| Janta Dal Rashtravadi | Vijendra Yadav | 2,177 | 1.18 | |
| NOTA | None of the above | 2,907 | 1.58 | |
| Majority | | 37,642 | 20.49 | |
| Turnout | | 183,722 | 60.21 | |
| RJD hold | | Swing | | |
