= Udakishunganj (community development block) =

Community development block in Madhepura district, Bihar, India

Udakishunganj उदाकिशनगंज
- Community development block
- Location in Bihar, India
- Coordinates: 25°40′37″N 86°56′35″E
- Country: India
- State: Bihar
- Region: Mithila
- District: Madhepura

Population (2001)
  - Total: 136,937

Languages
  - Official: Maithili, Hindi
- Time zone: UTC+5:30 (IST)
- Lok Sabha constituency: Madhepura
- Vidhan Sabha constituency: Alamnagar, Bihariganj
- Website: madhepura.bih.nic.in

Udakishunganj is a community development block in the Udakishunganj subdivision of Madhepura district in the Indian state of Bihar. It forms an important administrative unit within the subdivision and consists of several panchayats and villages. The block headquarters are located about 35 kilometres (22 mi) from the district headquarters at Madhepura. Udakishunganj plays a key role in local governance and rural development programmes implemented under the Panchayati raj system in Bihar.

== Geography ==
Udakishunganj is located at 25°40′37″N 86°56′35″E.

=== Panchayats ===
Panchayats in Udakishunganj community development block are: Madhuban, Rampur khora, Kishunganj, Lashkari, Lakshmipur, Biriranpal, Rahta Panhan, Manjaura, Jotaili, Barahi Anadpura, Aasinpur Akhari, Pipra Karoti, Nayanagar, Khara, Budhma, Sahjadpur, and Gopalpur.

Nayanagar is one of the important panchayats because Nayanagar Durga Sthan is situated at a distance of 11 km from Gwalpara Block HQ as well the same distance from Udakishunganj in the west and at the distance of 35 km from Madhepura Distt. HQ is not only famous for Manokamna Siddhi in Mahdepura but also in its adjacent areas. The devotees pay their floral and Bipatra offering to Goddess Durga for the fulfillment of their Manokamna. It is usually said that whose offering is accepted by Goddess his manokamna is fulfilled. The so-called Bairagana Mela is held on every Monday, Wednesday & Friday and the devotees come to worship and pay their offering to Goddess from distant places. Goddess Durga is sitting on flower ‘Lotus’ in peaceful gesture. Animal sacrifice is being offered to the Goddess Durga on the above said days. It would be seen form religious point of view that the status of Lord Chowmukh Mahadeo. Eleven Ubhay lingas and Sun God are also available in this pious place. Where as from archaeological point of view there are only some damaged idol and stone plates. It is said that during excavations a big stone platen was found. Though there is a legend of 100 years worship and foundation of this religious place. It is also said that Raja Radeo Singh was also a devotee of this place. This pious place is spread over the area of 22 acres of land and a big pond is existing before the main Temple in which the sacrificial animals are being bathed. It is also said that the people whose manokamna is fulfilled by the grace of Goddess they sacrificed the animals before the deity for her pleasure. Some sandal trees are also available there. It is said that such type of sandalwoods is found only in that holy place and that sandal is consumed in the worship of Goddess Durga. Sandalwood is not sold here for commercial purposes. The main Temple has been constructed with contribution cooperation of the common people and a committee has been formed to look after the management of the Temple. But the communication system especially relating to roads is very poor and hazardous for the devotees. Tourism Deptt. Of Govt. is not taking interest in the upliftment of this Temple. Perhaps in has not been taken over by the Govt. as yet. The people are willing the Govt. interest for this place so that it may get proper importance from religious and archeological point of view.

== Demographics ==
In the 2001 census Udakishunganj Block had a population of 136,937.

== See also ==
- बिहारीगंज, Madhepura (Vidhan Sabha constituency)
