= National Highway 131 (India) =

National highway in India

National Highway 131
- Map of National Highway 131 in red

Route information
- Length: 132 km (82 mi)

Major junctions
- South End end: Bihpur
- North End end: Birpur

Location
- Country: India
- States: Bihar
- Primary destinations: Birpur; Udakishanganj; Reshna; Madhepura; Singheshwar; Simrahi Bazar; Bhimnagar; Bihpur

Highway system
- Roads in India; Expressways; National; State; Asian
| ← NH 31 | → NH 131A |

National Highway 131 (NH 131), previously known as National Highway 106, is a national highway of India. It starts from Birpur in Supaul district to Bihpur in Bhagalpur district and passes through Madhepura district and terminates at Bihpur in Bhagalpur district of Bihar. It is major Highway of Madhepura district which starts at Birpur, passes through Simrahi, connects National Highway 57, Singheshwar, Madhepura junction to National Highway 231 (previously known National Highway 107), Reshna, Gwalpara, Udakisunganj, and terminates at Bihpur connects National Highway 31.

== Route ==
Bihpur, Puraini, Udakishanganj, Reshna Madhepura, Singheswar Sthan, Pipra, Simrahi Bazar, Bhimnagar, Birpur

== Junction ==
NH 31 Terminal at Bihpur
NH 231 near Madhepura
NH 27 near Simrahi Bazar
Terminate at Birpur

== See also ==
- National Highway 31 (India)
- List of national highways in India
- List of national highways in India by state
