= Vidyakar Kavi =

Indian politician

Vidyakar Kavi (1923 - 31 January 1986) was an Indian politician and social worker from Bihar. He was the former Education and Road Construction Minister of Bihar. He served as the president of the Bihar Pradesh Congress Committee. Kavi participated in the Quit India Movement of 1942 and started his career as a teacher. He served as a member of the Bihar Legislative Council from 1957 to 1967 and later represented Alamnagar Assembly constituency from 1967 to 1977. Under his leadership, the education system of Bihar was strengthened. He died in 1986 due to cardiac arrest.

== Biography ==
He was born in 1923 in Alamnagar, Madhepura district, in an elite family. His father, Manmohan Kavi, was a scholar of the Braj Bhasha.

He started his career as a teacher in a high school in Alamnagar. In 1953, he left teaching to become engaged in politics. He was a member of the Indian National Congress and held positions such as the President of the Bihar Pradesh Congress Committee and a cabinet member. He was a member of the Bihar Legislative Council from 1957 to 1967 and represented Alamnagar from 1967 to 1977. He served as the Education Minister and Road Construction Minister during this time. In 1969, when the Congress Party was not doing well in the state, he was made the President of the State Congress Committee. He was known for speaking his mind and not being afraid to criticize his own government.

The government of Bihar established the Vidyakar Kavi Literary Award in his honour and a library and inter-college were established posthumously in his name in Alamnagar. While in charge of the irrigation department as minister, he also implemented policies during a Patna flood crisis in 1970s that helped the city recover and prevented future damage. He was appointed as the first official language minister of Bihar.
