= Ramesh Rishidev =

Indian politician

Minister of SC & ST Welfare Department, Bihar
- In office 29 July 2017 – 15 November 2020
- Preceded by: Santosh Kumar Nirala

Member of the Bihar Legislative Assembly for Singheshwar
- In office November 2010 – November 2020
- Preceded by: Rameshwar Prasad Yadav
- Succeeded by: Chandrahas Chaupal

Member of the Bihar Legislative Assembly for Kumarkhand
- In office November 2005 – November 2010
- Preceded by: Bhupendra Rishideo
- Succeeded by: Delimited

Personal details
- Born: 22 January 1970 (age 55)
- Political party: Janata Dal (United)
- Education: Pre PhD (Philosophy)

Ramesh Rishidev is an Indian politician from Madhepura district of Bihar, India. He served as Minister of SC & ST Welfare Department, Government of Bihar and was a Member of Bihar Legislative Assembly representing Kumarkhand (Vidhan Sabha constituency).

== Early life ==
Rishidev was born on 22 January 1970 at Madhepura district of Bihar, India.

== Political career ==
He contested October 2005 Bihar Legislative Assembly election from Kumarkhand (Vidhan Sabha constituency) and won. Again he contested and won in 2010 and 2015 Bihar legislative assembly elections from Singheshwar (Vidhan Sabha constituency). He was appointed Minister of SC & ST Welfare Department, Government of Bihar in July 2017.
