= Chousa (community development block) =

Community development block in Madhepura district, Bihar, India

Chousa चौसा सामुदायिक विकास खंड Chousa
- Community development block
- Nickname: Chousa
- Location in Bihar, India
- Coordinates: 25°30′55″N 87°02′08″E
- Country: India
- State: Bihar
- Region: Anga
- District: Madhepura

Government
  - Type: Community development block
  - Body: POLICE STATION

Population (2001)
  - Total: 116,471

Languages
  - Official: Angika, Hindi
- Time zone: UTC+5:30 (IST)
- Postal code: 852213
- Lok Sabha constituency: Madhepura
- Vidhan Sabha constituency: Alamnagar
- Website: madhepura.bih.nic.in

Chousa is one of the administrative divisions of Madhepura district in the Indian state of Bihar. The block headquarters are located at a distance of 55 km from the district headquarters, namely, Madhepura.

== Geography ==
Chousa is located at 25°30′55″N 87°02′08″E

=== Panchayats ===
Panchayats in Chousa community development block are

- Rasalpur Dhuriya
- Ghausai
- Chausa east
- Chausa west
- Arajpur east
- Arajpur west
- Lauwalagan east
- Lauwalagan west
- Paina
- Chirouri
- Morsanda
- Phulaut east
- Phulaut west

== Demographics ==
In the 2001 census Chousa Block had a population of 116,471.

=== Religious Connection ===
Baba Bisuraut Mela: The most historic and Culturally celebrated festival every year. Baba Bisuraut Mandir is located at Pasrasi Asthan in the village of Lauwalagan. People of Koshi belt particularly cattlemen possess high regard and value for Baba Bisuraut and Baba is considered God for cattle in the region. Every year, from 13 April, a 3-days fair (Baba Bisuraut Mela) is held which famous across all the district of Bihar and adjoining states. Visiters and Traders from Nepal also take part this fair.

Muharram Mela: The most solemn and colourful Muslim function held in chousa organised by Muslim Community. Various plays and drama are held which is enjoyed all sections of society.

Durga pooja festival is celebrated by the people of Chousa. Previously it was managed by Lakhi Ram (Ex Congress President).

These Days Durga puja is being celebrated by the common people of chousa. There are three places in chousa for celebrate the festivals annually.

One of the most Festival that is 'Chhath' which is being celebrated in all over the Bihar, in the chousa the most popular place for this festival is a Small pond near Abhiya tola in chousa east as well as near agriculture field (near chousa market & bus stand chock).
