= Singheshwar Assembly constituency =

Coordinates: 25°59′10″N 86°47′42″E

Singheshwar
- Constituency No. 72 for the Bihar Legislative Assembly

Constituency details
- Country: India
- Region: East India
- State: Bihar
- District: Madhepura
- Established: 1977
- Total electors: 329,826

Member of Legislative Assembly
- 18th Bihar Legislative Assembly
- Incumbent Ramesh Rishidev
- Party: JD(U)
- Alliance: NDA
- Elected year: 2025

Singheshwar Assembly constituency is an assembly constituency in Madhepura district in the Indian state of Bihar. It has been reserved for scheduled castes since 2010. Earlier, it was an open seat.

== Overview ==
As per Delimitation of Parliamentary and Assembly constituencies Order, 2008, No. 72 Singheshwar Assembly constituency (SC) is composed of the following: Singheshwar, Shankarpur and Kumarkhand community development blocks.

Singheshwar Assembly constituency is part of No. 8 Supaul (Lok Sabha constituency) from 2010. It was earlier part of Madhepura (Lok Sabha constituency).

== Members of the Legislative Assembly ==
Year	Member	Party
1977	Dinbandhu Prasad Yadav	Janata Party
1980	Jai Kumar Singh	Indian National Congress
1981^	Ramendra Kumar Yadav	Indian National Congress
1985	Ramendra Kumar Yadav	Lok Dal
1990	Pappu Yadav	Independent politician
1995	Vijay Kumar Singh	Janata Dal
2000	Vijay Kumar Singh	Rashtriya Janata Dal
2005	Ramendra Kumar Yadav	Janata Dal (United)
2005	Ramendra Kumar Yadav	Janata Dal (United)
2010	Ramesh Rishidev	Janata Dal (United)
2015	Ramesh Rishidev	Janata Dal (United)
2020	Chandrahas Chaupal	Rashtriya Janata Dal
2025	Ramesh Rishidev	Janata Dal

== Election results ==
=== 2025 ===
2025 Bihar Legislative Assembly election: Singheshwar
Party	Candidate	Votes	%	±%
JD(U)	Ramesh Rishidev	106,416	46.43	▲4.22
RJD	Chandrahas Chaupal	103,434	45.13	▲0.0
Independent	Virendra Kumar Sharma	3,978	1.74	
JSP	Pramod Kumar Ram	3,516	1.53	
NOTA	None of the above	5,895	2.57	▲0.48
Majority		2,982	1.3	▼1.62
Turnout		229,174	69.48	▲7.99
JD(U) gain from		Swing		

=== 2020 ===
2020 Bihar Legislative Assembly election: Singheshwar
Party	Candidate	Votes	%	±%
RJD	Chandrahas Chaupal	86,181	45.13	
JD(U)	Ramesh Rishidev	80,608	42.21	▼7.24
LJP	Amit Kumar Bharti	5,607	2.94	
JAP(L)	Anil Kumar Bandhu	3,830	2.01	▼6.98
Aam Janmat Party	Shivjee Ram	2,354	1.23	
Bhartiya Lokmat Rashtrwadi Party	Surendra Sharma	2,292	1.2	
Jai Maha Bharath Party	Triful Devi	2,133	1.12	
NOTA	None of the above	3,998	2.09	▼2.03
Majority		5,573	2.92	▼26.96
Turnout		190,950	61.49	▲2.75
RJD gain from JD(U)		Swing		

=== 2015 ===
2015 Bihar Legislative Assembly election: Singheshwar
Party	Candidate	Votes	%	±%
JD(U)	Ramesh Rishidev	83,073	49.45	
HAM(S)	Manju Devi	32,873	19.57	
JAP(L)	Amit Kumar Bharti	15,106	8.99	
CPI(M)	Rajkishor Sardar	6,924	4.12	
BSP	Indo Devi	4,098	2.44	
Independent	Jagdev Ram	3,498	2.08	
Janta Dal Rashtravadi	Lalan Paswan	3,220	1.92	
Independent	Achhe Lal Sharma	3,048	1.81	
BJKD (D)	Sanjay Paswan	2,767	1.65	
Independent	Agamlal Rishidev	2,583	1.54	
The National Road Map Party of India	Dinesh Rishi Dev	2,080	1.24	
Garib Janta Dal (Secular)	Upendra Ram	1,784	1.06	
NOTA	None of the above	6,928	4.12	
Majority		50,200	29.88	
Turnout		167,982	58.74	
