= Bhairopatti =

Village in Madhepura, Bihar, India

- Village
- Location in Bihar, India Bhairopatti (India)
- Coordinates: 25.8962987°N 86.8931051°E
- Country: India
- State: Bihar
- District: Madhepura
- Block: Murliganj

Government
  - Type: Gram Panchayat
  - Body: Bhatkhora Gram Panchayat

Population (2011)
  - Total: 3,214
- PIN: 852114

Bhairopatti is a village located in the Murliganj block of Madhepura district, Bihar, India. It falls under the jurisdiction of the Bhatkhora Gram Panchayat.

== Geography ==
Bhairopatti is situated approximately 12 kilometers east of Murliganj, the nearest town. The village stands at an elevation of 52 meters above sea level.

== Demographics ==
According to the 2011 Census of India, Bhairopatti has a total population of 3,214, comprising 1,632 males and 1,582 females. The village has 701 households, with an average household size of about four persons. The sex ratio is 969 females for every 1,000 males.

The literacy rate in Bhairopatti is approximately 41.72%, with male literacy at 50.67% and female literacy at 32.49%. Scheduled Castes make up about 11.6% of the population, totaling 373 individuals.

== Infrastructure ==
=== Education ===
Bhairopatti has a government primary school. For higher education, residents usually attend institutions in Jitapur, which is more than one kilometer away.

=== Healthcare ===
Basic healthcare facilities are available in the village, while more advanced services are accessible in Murliganj.

=== Postal Services ===
The village is served by the postal code 852114.

== Transportation ==
Bhairopatti is well-connected by public and private bus services. The nearest railway station is Bhairopatti Halt (station code: BHTH), located within the village.

== Nearby villages ==
Nearby villages include Ramsingh Tola, Bhatkhora, and Jitapur.
