= Ghelardh (community development block) =

Community development block in Madhepura district, Bihar, India

Ghelardh ढेलढ
- Community development block
- Location in Bihar, India Ghelardh (India)
- Coordinates: 25°56′54″N 86°45′10″E
- Country: India
- State: Bihar
- Region: Mithila
- District: Madhepura

Population (2001)
  - Total: 73,129

Languages
  - Official: Maithili, Hindi
- Time zone: UTC+5:30 (IST)
- Lok Sabha constituency: Madhepura
- Vidhan Sabha constituency: Madhepura
- Website: madhepura.bih.nic.in

Ghailarh is one of the administrative divisions of Madhepura district in the Indian state of Bihar. The block headquarters are located at a distance of 32 km from the district headquarters, namely, Madhepura.

== Geography ==
Ghailarh is located at 25°56′54″N 86°45′10″E

=== Panchayats ===
Panchayats in Ghelardh community development block are: Srinagar, Chitti, Bhatrandha Parmanpur, Bardaha, Jhitkia, Ghailadh, Araha MahuaDighra, Bhan Tekthi and Ratanpura

== Demographics ==
In the 2011 census Ghailarh Block had a population of 91,821.
