= Bhupendra Narayan Mandal University =

Public university in Madhepura, Bihar, India

- Official logo of Bhupendra Narayan Mandal University
- Motto: सा विद्या या विमुक्तये
- Motto in English: True Knowledge liberates.
- Type: Public
- Established: 1992 (34 years ago)
- Founder: Lalu Prasad Yadav
- Affiliations: UGC
- Chancellor: Governor of Bihar
- Vice-Chancellor: Dr. Bimalendu Shekhar Jha
- Location: Laloo Nagar, Madhepura, Bihar, 852113, India
- Campus: Rural
- Website: bnmu.ac.in

Bhupendra Narayan Mandal University (BNMU), also known as B. N. Mandal University, is a state university located at Laloo Nagar in Madhepura, Bihar, India. It was established on 10 January 1992 and is named after socialist leader Bhupendra Narayan Mandal. The university has jurisdiction over the districts of Madhepura, Saharsa, and Supaul, and offers undergraduate, postgraduate, and doctoral programmes through its constituent and affiliated colleges.

== Colleges ==
Its jurisdiction extends over three districts: Madhepura, Saharsa, and Supaul.

=== Constituent Colleges ===
==== Madhepura District ====
- Bhupendra Narayan Mandal Vanijya Mahavidyalaya, Madhepura – 852113
- Harihar Saha College, Udakishungunj, Madhepura – 852113
- Kamleshwari Prasad College, Murliganj, Madhepura – 852122
- Parwati Science College, Madhepura – 852113
- Bhola Paswan Shastri College Babhangama Bihariganj Madhepura
- Thakur Prasad College, Madhepura – 852113

==== Saharsa District ====
- Maharaja Hariballav Memorial College, Sonbarsa Raj, Saharsa – 852129
- Manohar Lal Tekriwal College, Saharsa – 852201
- Rajendra Mishra College, Saharsa – 852201
- Ramesh Jha Mahila College, Saharsa – 852201
- R.M.M. Law College, Saharsa – 852201
- B.P.S College Babhangama
- Sarb Narayan Singh Ram Kumar Singh College, Saharsa – 852113

==== Supaul District ====
- Bharat Sevak Samaj College, Supaul – 852131
- Hari Prasad Sah College, Nirmali, Supaul – 847452
- B.P.Shastri Degree College
- Lalit Narayan Mishra Smarak College, Birpur, Supaul – 854340

=== Affiliated Colleges ===
==== Madhepura District ====
- Adarsh College, Ghailarh-Jiwachhpur, Madhepura
- B.S.S. Chandrakanta College, Uda Kishunganj, Madhepura
- B.S.R.K. College, Singheshwar, Madhepura
- C.M. Science College, Madhepura
- Bhola Paswan Shastri College Babhangama Bihariganj Madhepura
- Deo Nandini Degree College, Bakhri (Narsingbagh), Madhepura
- Evening College, Madhepura
- K.B. Women’s College, Madhepura
- Kamla Rana Science College, Puraini (Prashant Nagar), Madhepura
- Madhepura College, Madhepura
- Mohan Shakuntala Teacher’s Training College, Madhepura
- R.P.M. College, Tuniyahi, Madhepura
- Sant Awadh Kiriti Narayan Degree College, Madhepura
- Shivnandan Prasad Mandal Law College, Madhepura
- Subhash Chandra Bose College of Education, Kumarkhand, Madhepura
- U.V.K. College, Bhagipur (Karama), Madhepura
- Women’s College, Madhepura

==== Saharsa District ====
- Banwari Shankar College, Simraha, Saharsa
- Evening College, Saharsa
- Lahtan Choudhary College, Pastwar, Saharsa
- B. P. Shastri College Rajni Babhangama
- Laxmi Nath College, Bangaon, Saharsa
- Ranchandra Vidyapith, Sonbarsa, Saharsa

==== Supaul District ====
- Anooplal Yadav Mahavidyalaya, Triveniganj, Supaul
- Degree College, Supaul
- K.N. Degree College, Raghavpur, Supaul
- B.P.Shastri Degree College
- Radhe Shyam Teacher’s Training College, Pathara, Supaul
- S.N.S. Mahila College, Supaul

Svv Sr college bangawo
