= Rauta, India =

Rauta is a village in Purani Block in Madhepura district of Bihar State, India.
