= Kumarkhand (community development block) =

Community development block in Madhepura district, Bihar, India

Kumarkhand Town
- Town
- Location in Bihar, India Kumarkhand (India)
- Coordinates: 26°00′17″N 86°58′39″E
- Country: India
- State: Bihar
- Region: Mithila
- District: Madhepura

Population (2001)
  - Total: 187,643

Languages
  - Official: Maithili, Hindi
- Time zone: UTC+5:30 (IST)
- Lok Sabha constituency: Madhepura
- Vidhan Sabha constituency: Singheshwar
- Website: madhepura.bih.nic.in

Kumarkhand is a town in Madhepura district in the Indian state of Bihar. The block headquarters are located at a distance of 23 km from the district headquarters, namely, Madhepura.

== Geography ==
Kumarkhand is located at 26°00′17″N 86°58′39″E

=== Panchayats ===
Panchayats in Kumarkhand community development block are: Bishanpur Sarhad, Bishanpur Bazar, Puraini, Parmanandpur, Lakshmipur Bhagwati, Ramnagar Mahesh, Tengraha Sikiyaha, Rauta, Tengraha Parihari, Sihpur Gadhiya, Lakshmipur Chandisthan, Rahta, Belari, Bishanpur Korlahi, Ranipatti Sukhasan, Kumarkhand, Israin Khurd, Mangarwara, Israni Bela, Israin kala and #Baishadh(बैसाढ़).

== Demographics ==
In the 2011 census Kumarkhand town had a population of 14,127.

== See also ==
- Kumarkhand (Vidhan Sabha constituency)
