= Gamhariya (community development block) =

Community development block in Madhepura district, Bihar, India

Gamhariya गम्हारिया
- Community Development Block
- Nickname: Gateway to Kosi
- Location in Bihar, India Gamhariya (India)
- Coordinates: 26°02′38″N 86°42′30″E
- Country: India
- State: Bihar
- Region: Mithila
- District: Madhepura

Population (2011)
  - Total: 82,522

Languages
  - Official: Maithili, Hindi
- Time zone: UTC+5:30 (IST)
- Postal code: 852108
- Lok Sabha constituency: Madhepura
- Vidhan Sabha constituency: Madhepura
- Website: madhepura.bih.nic.in

Gamhariya is one of the administrative divisions of Madhepura district in the Indian state of Bihar. The block headquarters are located at a distance of 18km from the district headquarters, namely, Madhepura.

The Zip or Pin code of Gamhariya is 852108.

== Geography ==
Gamhariya is located at 26°02′38″N 86°42′30″E

== Schools ==
Saraswati Vidya Mandir,

Principal: Shri Suryanarayana Jha.

Gamhariya Public School

Residenstial Public School

== Panchayat ==
Panchayats in Gamhariya community development block are: Bhabani, Bhelwa, Gamhariya, Kodihar Tarewe, Orahi Ekperha, Itwa Jiwachhpur, Chikni and Jiwachhpur.

== Demographics ==
According to the 2011 census, Gamhariya Block had a population of 82,522. While at the same time, Gamhariya Village has the estimated population of 9,359.
