= Phulaut =

- Village
- Location in Bihar, India Phulaut (India)
- Coordinates: 25°30′41″N 86°56′15″E
- Country: India
- State: Bihar
- District: Madhepura

Population
  - Total: 15,454 (2,001 census)

Languages
  - Official: Angika, Maithili, Hindi
- Time zone: UTC+5:30 (IST)
- PIN: 852219
- Telephone code: 916479
- Coastline: 0 kilometres (0 mi)
- Nearest city: Bhagalpur
- Sex ratio: 89.02% ♂/♀
- Literacy: 28.05%%
- Vidhan Sabha constituency: Alamnagar

Phulaut is one of the villages in Chousa block, Madhepura district in the Indian state of Bihar. It is situated and connected by NH 106. It is located at a distance of 55 km from the district headquarters Madhepura.

The village has many temples, three middle schools, and one high school. It hosts a fair every December.

== Geography ==
Phulaut is divided into two halves: Panchayat Poorvi and Paschimi panchayat. The famous Maa Jwalamukhi Sthan situated at the heart of village.

Kosi river passes through near the village and often floods during the rainy season.

== Location ==
Phulaut is located here.

Nearby cities include Bhagalpur, Bihpur, and Bihariganj.

Phulaut is the largest and most populated village in Madhepura district.

== Population ==
The total population of the village is 15,454. The literacy rate is 28.5% and female literacy rate is 16.53% as per the 2001 census. The number of households in Phulaut is 2,620. The village has a female to male ratio of Phulaut of 89.02%. This is less than the state's female to male ratio 91.93%.
