= Alamnagar =

Community development block in Madhepura district, Bihar, India

Alamnagar ALAMNAGAR
- Community development block
- Nickname: ALAMNAGAR
- Location in Bihar, India Alamnagar (India)
- Coordinates: 25°32′56″N 86°54′40″E
- Country: India
- State: Bihar
- Region: Mithila
- District: Madhepura

Population (2001)
  - Total: 129,226

Languages
  - Official: Maithili, Hindi
- Time zone: UTC+5:30 (IST)
- Lok Sabha constituency: Madhepura
- Vidhan Sabha constituency: Alamnagar
- Website: madhepura.bih.nic.in

Alamnagar (community development block) is one of the administrative divisions of Madhepura district in the Indian state of Bihar. The block headquarters are located at a distance of 58 km from the district headquarters, namely, Madhepura. The name of Alamnagar is named for Shah Alamgir. Almost alls caste of Hindus and Muslims live together. Khara Budhama is also attached in Alamnagar vidhan shabha from udakishunganj. Khara is located 12 km from Alamnagar.

== Geography ==
Alamnagar is located at 25°32′56″N 86°54′40″E

=== Panchayats ===
Panchayats in Alamnagar community development block are: Bispatti, Basanbara, [Khurhan, Bargaon, Singhar, Itahari, Alamnagar North, Alamnagar South, Alamnagar East, Northua Bhagipur, Kujauri, Gangapur, Kishanpur Ratwara and Khapur.

== Demographics ==
In the 2001 census Alamnagar Block had a population of 129,226.
