= Vijay Kumar Singh (politician, died 2021) =

Indian politician

Member of Legislative Assembly
- In office 2000–2005
- Preceded by: Bam Bhola Yadav
- Succeeded by: Ramendra Kumar Yadav
- Constituency: Singheshwar

Personal details
- Born: Bihar, India
- Died: 27 April 2021 Srinagar, Madhepura
- Party: Rashtriya Janata Dal
- Spouse: Radha Singh

Vijay Kumar Singh (died 2021) was an Indian politician from Bihar.

== Early life and education ==
Singh was born in Srinagar, Madhepura district, Bihar. His father Jai Kumar Singh was also a MLA from Singheshwar Assembly constituency.

== Political career ==
He represented the Singheshwar Assembly constituency as a member of the Bihar Legislative Assembly from 2000 to 2005. He was a member of the Rashtriya Janata Dal. In 2005, he failed to secure re-election.

== Death ==
Singh died in 2021 from COVID-19.
