= Tanuk Lal Yadav =

Indian politician

- Born: Madhepura, Bengal Presidency
- Died: Madhepura, Bihar
- Occupation: Politician

Tanuk Lal Yadav was an Indian politician. He was elected as a member of Bihar Legislative Assembly from 1952 to 1957 from Alamnagar, Bihar on Socialist Party ticket.
