= Vijay Kumar Singh =

Vijay Kumar Singh may refer to:

- Vijay Kumar Singh (politician, died 2021), Indian politician
- V. K. Singh (born 1950), Indian politician and general in the Indian Army
- Vijay Kumar Singh (Bihar), Indian politician
- Vijay Kumar Singh, the protagonist of the 1983 Indian film Andhaa Kaanoon, played by Rajinikanth
