= Puraini (community development block) =

Community development block in Madhepura district, Bihar, India

Puraini पुरैनी Puraini Bazar
- Block
- Location Bihar, India
- Coordinates: 25°35′56″N 86°59′22″E
- Country: India
- State: Bihar
- Region: Mithila
- District: Madhepura

Population (2001)
  - Total: 77,792

Languages
  - Official: Maithili, Hindi, Urdu
- Time zone: UTC+5:30 (IST)
- Postal code: 852116
- Lok Sabha constituency: Madhepura
- Vidhan Sabha constituency: Alamnagar
- Website: madhepura.bih.nic.in

Puraini is one of the administrative divisions of Madhepura district in the Indian state of Bihar. The block headquarters are located at a distance of 48 km from the district headquarters, namely, Madhepura.

== Geography ==
Puraini is located at 26°02′35″N 87°00′46″E.

=== Panchayats ===
Panchayats in Puraini community development block are: Kurshandi, Sapardah, Aurai, Nardah, Ganeshpur, dharmapur Puraini, Banshgopal, Makdampur and Durgapur.

== Demographics ==
In the 2001 census Puraini Block had a population of 77,792.
