= Bhatkhora =

Village in Madhepura, Bihar, India

- Village
- Location in Bihar, India Bhatkhora (India)
- Coordinates: 25.9187216°N 86.9079977°E
- Country: India
- State: Bihar
- District: Madhepura
- Block: Murliganj

Government
  - Type: Gram Panchayat
  - Body: Bhatkhora Gram Panchayat

Population (2011)
  - Total: 8,521

Languages
  - Official: Hindi, Urdu
- Time zone: UTC+5:30 (IST)
- PIN: 852114
- Vehicle registration: BR-43

Bhatkhora is a village located in the Murliganj block of Madhepura district, Bihar, India. It falls under the jurisdiction of the Bhatkhora Gram Panchayat.

== Demographics ==
According to the 2011 Census of India, Bhatkhora has a population of 8,521, with 4,317 males and 4,204 females. Children aged 0–6 years number 1,883, which is 22.1% of the total population. The average sex ratio is 974, higher than the Bihar state average of 918. The overall literacy rate is 50.03%. Male literacy is 61.15%, while female literacy is 38.70%.

== Postal services ==
Bhatkhora is served by the Bhatkhora Branch Office, a sub-post office under the Saharsa postal division. The village has the postal code 852114.

== Infrastructure ==
The village has basic infrastructure facilities including road connectivity and access to electricity. Educational institutions and healthcare facilities are available in nearby areas.

== Transport ==
The nearest railway station is Bhairopatti Halt railway station (BHTH), located about 3 km from the village.

== Nearby villages ==
Nearby villages include Bhairopatti and Jitapur.
