= Kumarkhand Assembly constituency =

Former constituency of the Bihar legislative assembly in India

Coordinates: 26°00′17″N 86°58′39″E

Kumarkhand
- Former constituency for the Bihar Legislative Assembly

Constituency details
- Country: India
- Region: East India
- State: Bihar
- District: Madhepura
- Established: 1977
- Abolished: 2008

Kumarkhand Assembly constituency was an assembly constituency in Madhepura district in the Indian state of Bihar. It was reserved for Scheduled castes.

As a consequence of the orders of the Delimitation Commission of India, Kumarkhand Assembly constituency ceased to exist in 2010.

It was part of Madhepura Lok Sabha constituency.

== Results ==
=== 1977-2005 ===
In the October 2005 state assembly election, Ramesh Rishidev of JD(U) won the Kumarkhaand (SC) assembly seat defeating his nearest rival Amit Kumar Bharti of RJD. Contests in most years were multi cornered but only winners and runners are being mentioned. Amit Kumar Bharti of RJD defeated Nepali Rajak of JD(U) in February 2005. Bhupendra Rishideo of RJD defeated Amit Kumar Bharti representing JD(U) in 2000. Upendra Narayan Hazra of JD defeated Janak Ram of Congress in 1995. Nawal Kishore Bharti of JD defeated Domi Ram of Congress in 1990. Nawal Kishore Bharti of LD defeated Yashoda Devi of Congress in 1985. Nawal Kishore Bharti of Janata Party (Secular – Charan Singh) defeated Jaikrishna Hazara of Congress in 1980. Nawal Kishore Rishideo of JP defeated Janak Ram of Congress in 1977.
