= Murliganj (community development block) =

Community development block in Madhepura district, Bihar, India

Murliganj मुरलीगंज
- Community development block
- Location in Bihar, India Murliganj (India)
- Coordinates: 25°53′31″N 86°59′17″E
- Country: India
- State: Bihar
- Region: Mithila
- District: Madhepura

Population (2001)
  - Total: 164,148

Languages
  - Official: Maithili, Hindi
- Time zone: UTC+5:30 (IST)
- Lok Sabha constituency: Madhepura
- Vidhan Sabha constituency: Madhepura, Bihariganj
- Website: madhepura.bih.nic.in

Muraliganj is one of the administrative divisions of Madhepura district in the Indian state of Bihar. The block headquarters are located at a distance of 18 km from the district headquarters, namely, Madhepura.

== Geography ==
Murliganj is located at 25°53′31″N 86°59′17″E.

=== Panchayats ===
Panchayats in Murliganj community development block are: Jitapur, Haripur Kala, Digghi, Singion, Raghunathpur, Kolhaypatti Dumriya, Rajni, Gangapur, Dinapatti Sakhuwa, Belo, Nadhi, Pokhram Parmanadpur, Bhatkhora, Tamot Parsa, Jorgama, Rampur and Parwa Navtol.

== Demographics ==
In the 2001 census Murliganj Block had a population of 164,148.
