= Shivnandan Prasad Mandal =

Indian politician from Bihar

Member of the Bihar Legislative Assembly
- In office 1952–1962
- Preceded by: New constituency
- Succeeded by: Jai Kumar Singh
- Constituency: Murliganj

Personal details
- Born: 18 April 1891 Ranipatti, Bhagalpur district, British India
- Died: Unknown Madhepura, Bihar
- Party: Indian National Congress
- Relations: Kamleshwari Prasad Yadav Tintanga Karari (son-in-law), Maheshwari Prasad Yadav Founder of Maheshwari Brothers Jamshedpur (Elder Brother of son-in-law), Babu Santlal Das (Child's Father-in-law)
- Children: 1 (Tripurareshwari Devi)

Shivanandan Prasad Mandal was a Zamindar, freedom fighter and politician. He was the first law minister of Bihar. He played a role in the Bang Bhang movement, the non-cooperation movement and the salt movement.

Sivanandan Prasad Mandal was born in a Zamindar (Landlord) family of Ranipatti village in the erstwhile Saharsa district (now in Madhepura).
