= Singheshwar (community development block) =

Community development block in Madhepura district, Bihar, India

- Community development block
- Location in Bihar, India
- Coordinates: 25°59′10″N 86°47′42″E
- Country: India
- State: Bihar
- Region: Mithila
- District: Madhepura

Population (2001)
  - Total: 102,086

Languages
  - Official: Maithili, Hindi
- Time zone: UTC+5:30 (IST)
- Lok Sabha constituency: Supaul
- Vidhan Sabha constituency: Singheshwar
- Website: madhepura.bih.nic.in

Singheshwar is one of the administrative divisions of Madhepura district in the Indian state of Bihar. The block headquarters are located at a distance of 6 km from the district headquarters, namely, Madhepura. There's a temple of Lord Shiva. Devotees come from many places for puja. In month of Saavan Singheshwar is jam packed by people. People from Nepal also come for puja.

== Geography ==
Singheshwar is located at 26°59′10″N 86°47′42″E.

=== Panchayats ===
Panchayats in Singheshwar community development block are: Rampatti, Manpur, Kamargama, Dular Piprahi, Rupoli, Bhawanipur, Sukhasan, Jajhat Sabela, Singheshwar, Patori, Lalpur Saropatti, Baheri, Goripur and Itahari Gahumani.

== Mythology ==
The Shiva temple at Singheswar, also called Singheshwar Sthan, has religious significance since ancient times, as this land was the meditation place of Rishi Shringi. Hence, this place is considered to be the most pious for the Hindus. It is said that during the Ramayana period a Putreshthee Yajna was performed by Raja Dashratha and he was blessed with four sons from the prasad “Charu” of that mahayajna.

The great Sringhi Rishi (Rishyasringa) primarily worshipped Lord Shiva on the occasion of that yajna. Seven “Havana Kunds” created at that time has been converted into a ravaged tank now. Eventually the residential place of Sringi Rishi became famous as Singheshwar. It is visited by lakhs of pilgrims. Sundays and Mondays are very important for the devotees. Mahashivratri Mela (which is one of the Rajkiya Mela of Bihar) of Singheshwarasthan is famous.

Reference of Singheshwarasthan has been found in Varaha Purana too. According to that purana this place was once surrounded with forests. During the course of cattle grazing they observed that a virgin cow used to sprinkle milk at a particular place. The cattle roamers saw the strange action of that cow one day and began to dig at that place. After digging they got a Shivlinga which they began to worship. Gradually people become aware of this incident and in course of time a small temple was constructed there.

The mythological story behind this place is that Goddess Maha Kali, Maha Laxmi and Maha Sarswati are assimilated into the form Goddess Durga and she being lion rider is called Singheshwari. Her counterpart Lord Brahma. Vishnu and Mahakal Shankar are assimilated into the form of eternal god is called Singheshwar. Three part of the Shivling is the expression of Trimurti.

It is said that pundit Mandan Mishra was residing and a scholarly debate on religion was held between Mandan Mishra and Adi Sankaryacharya. After that debate Pt. Mandan Mishra adopted the cult sanatan. Lord Buddha’s statue of Avalokiteshwara on the southern wall of the eastern-sided temple shows the acceptance of Lord Shiva’s eternal Omnipresence.

== Demographics ==
In the 2001 census Singheshwar Block had a population of 102,086.
