= Madhepura (community development block) =

Community development block in Madhepura district, Bihar, India

Madhepura मधेपुरा
- Community development block
- Location in Bihar, India Madhepura (India)
- Coordinates: 25°55′01″N 86°46′43″E
- Country: India
- State: Bihar
- Region: Mithila
- District: Madhepura

Population (2001)
  - Total: 194,620

Languages
  - Official: Maithili, Hindi
- Time zone: UTC+5:30 (IST)
- Lok Sabha constituency: Madhepura
- Vidhan Sabha constituency: Madhepura
- Website: madhepura.bih.nic.in

Madhepura is one of the administrative divisions of Madhepura district in the Indian state of Bihar. The block headquarters are located at a distance of 2 km from the district headquarters, namely, Madhepura.

== Geography ==
Madhepura is located at 25°55′01″N 86°46′43″E.

=== Panchayats ===
Panchayats in Madhepura community development block are: Barahi, Sahugarh 1, ganeshsthan, Sahugarh 2, Mathahi, Balam Gadhiya, Khopaiti Tuniahi, Sukhasan, Madanpur, Madhuban, Manikpur, Tulsibari rajpur malia, Sakarpura Betona, Mahesua, Dhurgawn, Bhadaul Budhma, Murho, Manpur and Bhelwa.

== Demographics ==
In the 2001 census, Madhepura Block had a population of 194,620.

== See also ==
- Madhepura
