= Singheshwar Sthan =

Hindu temple in India

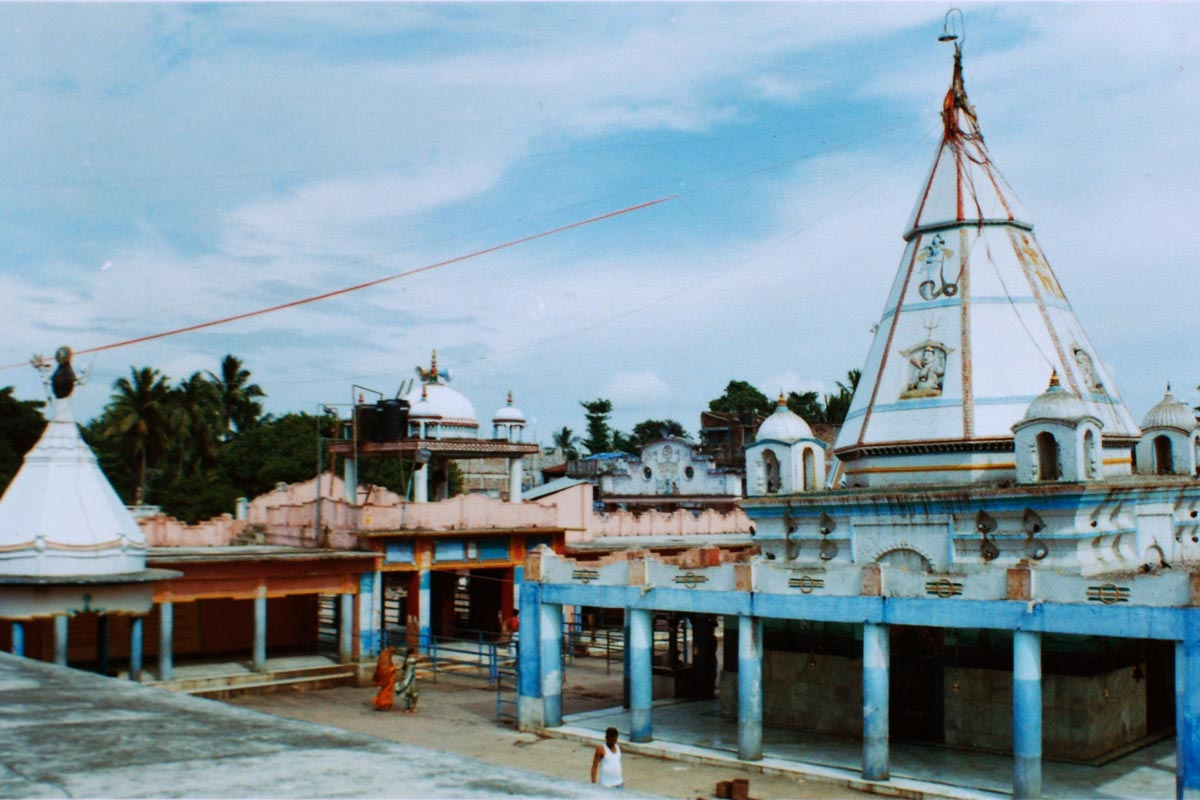
- The Temple of Singheshwar Sthan The Shiva linga of Singheswar Sthan

Religion
- Affiliation: Hinduism
- District: Madhepura district
- Deity: Shiva

Location
- Location: Singheswar Sthan, Madhepura
- State: Bihar
- Country: India
- Interactive map of Singheshwar Sthan
- Coordinates: 25.983646°N 86.795517°E

Architecture
- Creator: unknown
- Elevation: 47 m (154 ft)

Singheshwar Sthan (Hindi: सिंहेश्वर स्थान), also known as Singheshwar Mahadev, is a revered Hindu temple, dedicated to the lord Shiva, located in Madhepura, Bihar, India. The temple holds immense religious and historical significance in Mithila region and long been a center for tantric worship.

The temple's ancient legend is linked to the Ramayana, the Vedic sage Shringi performed yajna for King Dasharatha to beget a son. A month long fair, Singheshwar Mahtotsav was held during Maha Shivaratri, when the devotees turned higher in numbers. The visitors also visit this temple in Shraavana, Naga Panchami, and Kartik Purnima.

== Etymology ==
The temple name is derived from the Vedic sage Sringi, who lived here for many years in his Ashram near the temple. Earlier, this place was known as Sringheshwar Sthan, but over time it was apabhraṃśa to Singheshwar Sthan.

== History ==
According to legends and folklore, the Mahadev Sthan was ancient and established by sage Sringi. It is also said that a scholarly debate on religion was held between Maṇḍana Miśra and Adi Sankaracharya around the 8th century; after that debate, Maṇḍana Miśra adopted the cult of Sanatan. The present temple appears to be built in the Tirhut style around the early 19th century. A wood merchant, Hari Charan Chaudhary, built the present temple on the very same place where the Shiva linga was installed. The temple was built on the bank of the Koshi River at the time, but later the Koshi River changed its course to a westward direction.

== Location ==
It is located 7 kilometres (4.3 mi) north of the district headquarters Madhepura in Singheshwar village.
