= Simrahi =

Nagar Panchayat of Supaul, Bihar

Simrahi सिमराही (Hindi)
- Nagar Panchayat
- Interactive map of Simrahi
- Coordinates: 26.3089020°N 86.8445435°E
- Country: India
- State: Bihar
- District: Supaul
- Nagar Panchayat: March 3, 2021

Area
  - Total: 6.05 km^{2} (2.34 sq mi)
- Elevation: 63 m (207 ft)

Population (2011)
  - Total: 15,883
  - Density: 2,630/km^{2} (6,800/sq mi)

Languages
  - Official: Hindi
  - Regional: Maithili
- Time zone: UTC+5:30 (IST)
- PIN: 85211
- ISO 3166 code: IN-BR
- Vehicle registration: BR-50
- Lok Sabha constituency: Supaul
- Vidhan Sabha constituency: Nirmali
- Website: npsimrahi.in

Simrahi is a Nagar panchayat in the Raghopur block of Supaul district in the Mithila region of Bihar, India. Simrahi was declared a nagar panchayat on March 3, 2021 with the merger of former villages Simrahi and Piprahi. At the 2011 Indian census, the localities had a joint population of 15,883 people living in 3,160 households. It is located 37 km (23 mi) north of the district headquarters Supaul and is connected by the National Highway 27 and National Highway 131. The town area covers 6.05 km^{2} (2.34 sq mi) and comprises 17 wards. Roadways are the main mode of transportation to the town, and the nearest railway station, Raghopur railway station is in Raghopur.

== History ==
Simrahi is historically part of the Mithila region.

== Demography ==
In the 2011 India census, Simrahi village had a population of 11,415, and Piprahi village had 4,468. In 2021, after the merger of both villages into the Simrahi Nagar Panchayat, the total population tallied 15,883.
