= Alamnagar Assembly constituency =

Coordinates: 25°32′56″N 86°54′40″E

- Constituency No. 70 for the Bihar Legislative Assembly

Constituency details
- Country: India
- Region: East India
- State: Bihar
- District: Madhepura
- Lok Sabha constituency: 13. Madhepura
- Established: 1951
- Reservation: None

Member of Legislative Assembly
- 18th Bihar Legislative Assembly
- Incumbent Narendra Narayan Yadav
- Party: JD(U)
- Alliance: NDA
- Elected year: 2025

Alamnagar Assembly constituency is an assembly constituency in Madhepura district in the Indian state of Bihar.

== Overview ==
As per Delimitation of Parliamentary and Assembly constituencies Order, 2008, No. 70 Alamnagar Assembly constituency is composed of the following: Alamnagar, Puraini and Chausa community development blocks; Rahta Phanhan, Nayanagar, Sahjadpur, Lashkari, Manjora, Jotaili, Khara, Budhma and Gopalpur of Udakishunganj CD Block.

Alamnagar Assembly constituency is part of No. 13 Madhepura (Lok Sabha constituency).

== Members of Legislative Assembly ==
Year	Member	Party
1952	Tanuk Lal Yadav	Socialist Party
1957	Yadunandan Jha	Indian National Congress
1962	Yadunandan Jha	Indian National Congress
1967	Vidyakar Kavi	Indian National Congress
1969	Vidyakar Kavi	Indian National Congress
1972	Vidyakar Kavi	Indian National Congress
1977	Birendra Kumar Singh	Janata Party
1980	Birendra Kumar Singh	Janata Party
1985	Birendra Kumar Singh	Lokdal
1990	Birendra Kumar Singh	Janata Dal
1995	Narendra Narayan Yadav	Janata Dal
2000	Narendra Narayan Yadav	Janata Dal (United)
2005	Narendra Narayan Yadav	Janata Dal (United)
2005	Narendra Narayan Yadav	Janata Dal (United)
2010	Narendra Narayan Yadav	Janata Dal (United)
2015	Narendra Narayan Yadav	Janata Dal (United)
2020	Narendra Narayan Yadav	Janata Dal (United)
2025	Narendra Narayan Yadav	Janata Dal (United)

== Election results ==
=== 2025 ===
2025 Bihar Legislative Assembly election: Alamnagar
Party	Candidate	Votes	%	±%
JD(U)	Narendra Narayan Yadav	138,401	53.98	▲5.81
VIP	Nabin Nishad	82,936	32.35	
JSP	Subodh Kumar Suman	8,934	3.48	
Independent	Rubi Kumari	4,695	1.83	
Independent	Vikram Kumar Gupta	3,178	1.24	
Independent	Binod Ashish	2,707	1.06	
The National Road Map Party of India	Akhatar Mansuri	2,576	1.0	
NOTA	None of the above	7,959	3.1	▲0.94
Majority		55,465	21.63	▲8.15
Turnout		256,381	71.16	▲9.4
JD(U) hold		Swing		

=== 2020 ===
Bihar Assembly election, 2020: Alamnagar
Party	Candidate	Votes	%	±%
JD(U)	Narendra Narayan Yadav	102,517	48.17	+2.43
RJD	Naveen Nishad	73,837	34.69	
LJP	Sunila Devi	9,287	4.36	−18.57
JAP(L)	Sarveshwar Prasad Singh	8,466	3.98	+1.21
RLSP	Md. Iftekhar Alam	4,596	2.16	
Bharat Jago Janta Party	Sudhanshu Kumar	3,054	1.43	
SAP	Rajnandan Kumar Sinha	2,254	1.06	
NOTA	None of the above	4,595	2.16	−0.77
Majority		28,680	13.48	−9.33
Turnout		212,829	61.76	+0.4
JD(U) hold		Swing		

=== 2015 ===
2015 Bihar Legislative Assembly election: Alamnagar
Party	Candidate	Votes	%	±%
JD(U)	Narendra Narayan Yadav	87,962	45.74	
LJP	Chandan Singh	44,086	22.93	
Independent	Shashi Bhushan Singh	18,919	9.84	
JMM	Nirmal Paswan	7,375	3.84	
JAP(L)	Jai Prakash Singh	5,333	2.77	
Independent	Shyamdeo Paswan	4,905	2.55	
CPI	Ramdev Singh	3,812	1.98	
Independent	Prashant Kumar Sinha	3,170	1.65	
Independent	Banarsi Mandal	2,183	1.14	
Independent	Gopal Kumar Radhe Radhe	2,000	1.04	
Independent	Rajendra Prasad Mahto	1,829	0.95	
BSP	Ravindra Singh	1,764	0.92	
NOTA	None of the above	5,638	2.93	
Majority		43,876	22.81	
Turnout		192,299	61.36	
