= Chandrahas Chaupal =

Indian politician

Member of Bihar Legislative Assembly
- In office 2020–2025
- Preceded by: Ramesh Rishidev
- Succeeded by: Ramesh Rishidev
- Constituency: Singheshwar

Personal details
- Party: Rashtriya Janata Dal
- Profession: Politician

Chandrahas Chaupal is an Indian politician from Bihar and a Member of the Bihar Legislative Assembly. Sri Chaupal won the Singheshwar Assembly constituency on the RJD ticket in the 2020 Bihar Legislative Assembly election. He defeated Dr. Ramesh Rishidev, a former Schedule Caste and Schedule Tribe Welfare minister of Bihar from Janta Dal United in his first attempt. He was also appointed Shunykal Sabhapati.

== Personal life ==
He is a resident of Raibhid village of Shankarpur Block in Madhepura District, Bihar. He belongs to the Chaupal baniya community. His father Baldev Chaupal is a retired school teacher. Sri Chaupal has done Intermediate in 1993 from Saharsa college, now named M.L.T College, Saharsa.

== Social life ==
Shri Chandrahas Chaupal was connected with social work for 20 years. He has represented his Panchayat earlier by winning in Panchayat Election.
