= Chandrashekhar Yadav =

Indian politician

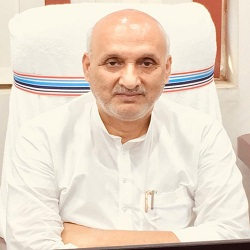
- Education minister of Bihar

Member of the Bihar Legislative Assembly
- Incumbent
- Assumed office 2010
- Preceded by: Manindra Kumar Mandal
- Constituency: Madhepura

Minister of Education Government of Bihar
- In office August 2022 – January 2024
- Preceded by: Vijay Kumar Chaudhary
- Succeeded by: Alok Kumar Mehta

Minister of Sugarcane Industries Government of Bihar
- In office January 2024 – January 2024
- Preceded by: Alok Kumar Mehta

Personal details
- Born: Madhepura, Bihar
- Party: Rashtriya Janata Dal
- Profession: Professor

Chandrashekhar Yadav (born 1962) is an Indian politician from Bihar. He is 4th term MLA from Madhepura Assembly constituency and also served as a Minister of Education in the Government of Bihar. He won for the fourth consecutive time 2010, 2015, 2020, 2025 representing the Rashtriya Janata Dal. In current scenario he's the biggest RJD leader of Kosi zone defeating Pappu Yadav(currently MP of Purnia) in 2020 Bihar SLA elections from Madhepura, 73 constituency.

== Early life and education ==
Yadav is from Madhepura, Bihar. He is the son of Anirudh Prasad Yadav. He is a lecturer. He completed his B.Com. in 1981 at College of Commerce, Magadh University, Bodhgaya and later did his post graduation in 1985 at Kanpur University, Kanpur.

== Career ==
Yadav first became an MLA winning the 2010 Bihar Legislative Assembly election. Earlier, he lost the 2005 election as an independent but he secured 30% votes in this election and stood to second position and RJD was at third position and subsequently he Rejoined RJD in 2010. He is recognized for his advocacy on behalf of farmers' rights, he played a role in establishing Food Corporation of India centers in the Kosi and Madhepura regions in 1990s.

In 2025 Bihar SLA election he won by the margin of 7800 and this was his fourth consecutive win. He won the 2020 Bihar Legislative Assembly election representing the Rashtriya Janata Dal from Madhepura Assembly constituency. He polled 79,839 votes and defeated his nearest rival, Nikhil Mandal of JDU by a margin of 15,072 votes. He served as education minister in the Nitish Kumar government from August 2022. Earlier, he served as Minister of Disaster Management, Bihar from 2015 to 2017. In January 2024, he became the Sugarcane Industries Department Minister.

== Controversies ==
On 14 September 2023, Chandra Shekhar stirred a controversy at an event on Hindi Diwas as he compared the Hindu religious book Ramcharitmanas to potassium cyanide, a poisonous compound. He allegedly raised his voice against few paragraphs of Hindu mythology book "Ramcharitra Manas", which according to him is oppressive against Dalits, and these paragraphs should be revised. "If you serve 56 kinds of good dishes and mix potassium cyanide into them would you eat them, he reportedly questioned referring to some controversial paragraphs of Ramcharitra manas which is against backward and dalit castes. And said, "The same analogy applies to the Ramcharitramanas," he said. Shekhar's party colleagues backed his statement saying that RJD party's ideology is of social justice. However RJD's ally Janata Dal United (JDU) said that it disapproves of such comments.
