= Birpur, Supaul =

Birpur
- city
- Interactive map of Birpur
- Coordinates: 26°30′56″N 87°00′31″E
- Country: India
- State: Bihar
- District: Supaul
- Elevation: 77 m (253 ft)

Population (2001)
  - Total: 17,730
- Time zone: UTC+5:30 (IST)
- Postal code: 854340
- ISO 3166 code: IN-BR

Birpur is a city and a notified area in Supaul district in the state of Bihar, India. It is a small town on the Indo-Nepal border near the historic Koshi Barrage on the Koshi River. It has an airstrip, which is being modernised and later on will be utilized for commercial as well defence use. It had been made when first prime minister of India Jawaharlal Nehru had landed here to lay the foundation stone of Koshi Barrage. There has been a new helipad constructed next to the airstrip for multi purpose use and it will be operational in 2026.

The population of Birpur is mixed. The town mostly consists of colonies made for employees and officers of Koshi project. Its Koshi High School was once most sought after school in entire Koshi region. There is also a middle school up to standard eighth viz. Koshi Middle School. There is also a Koshi Club here, adjacent to the school campus. It is a center for sports and cultural activities.

There is also a government college named Lalit Naryan Mishra Smarak Mahavidyalay on the name of Lalit Narayan Mishra, who was railway minister of India from 1973 to 1975 and who died in 1975 in a bomb blast at Samastipur. His birthplace, Balua, is 13 kilometer towards the south from Birpur.

Neighbouring areas are Basantpur, Bhimnagar, Kataiya Power House, which is a hydro power plant, { 𝘼𝙖𝙯𝙖𝙙 𝘾𝙡𝙪𝙗 𝙃𝙚𝙧𝙤 𝘾𝙝𝙤𝙬𝙠 } Hriday Nagar, Bhavanipur, Sitapur Nearest railway head from Birpur is Raghopur in the south and Forbesganj and Jogbani in the east. There is direct train from Jogbani to Kolkata and Delhi. Jogbani is well connected from Birpur. One can easily reach Jogbani via auto or buses which are available at Gol Chowk and bus stand. The train to Delhi is called Seemanchal Express. The train to Kolkata is Jogbani Kolkata Express.A new railway line is under construction from lalitgram to birpur town.

Birpur is well-connected to nearby areas through regular bus services. Direct bus services are available towards Supaul, Saharsa, Purnea, Delhi, Patna & Darbhanga.

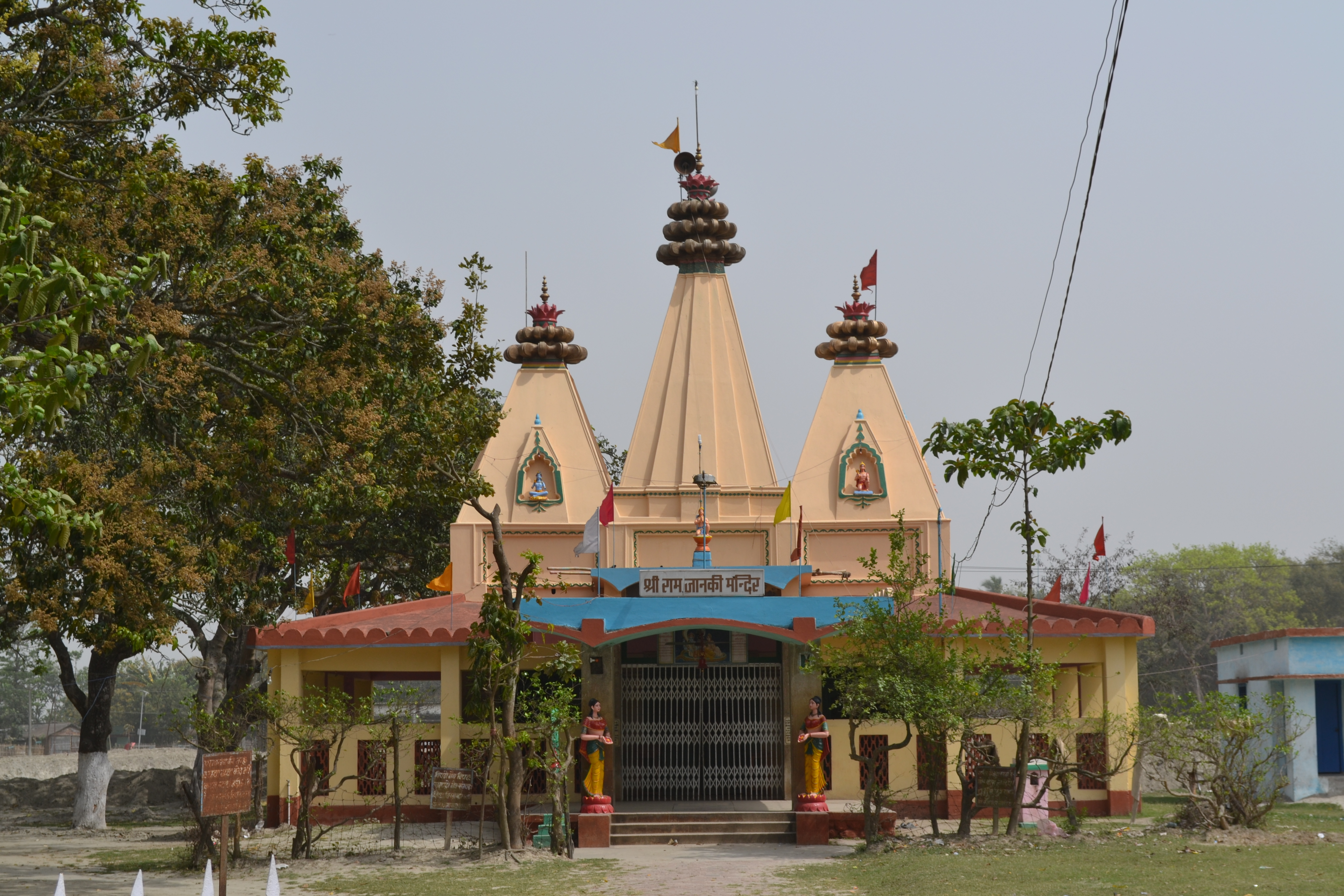
Ram Janki Temple

Lalit Narayan Mishra used to live in Birpur.

== Demographics ==
The population of children aged 0–6 is 2974 which is 14.92% of total population of Birpur (NP). In Birpur Nagar Panchayat, the female sex ratio is 864 against state average of 918. Moreover the child sex ratio in Birpur is around 973 compared to Bihar state average of 935. literacy rate of Birpur city is 79.91% higher than the state average of 61.80%. In Birpur, male literacy is around 86.67% while the female literacy rate is 71.92%. as per census 2011.

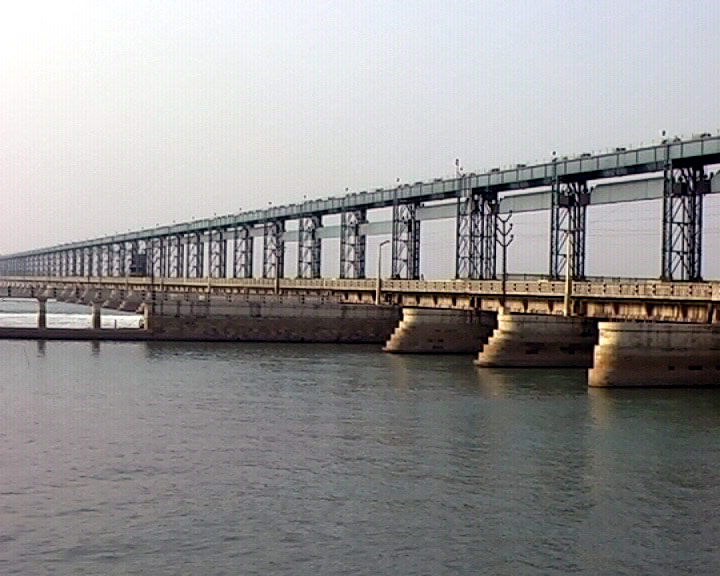
Koshi Barrage

== Medical facility ==
There is one Sub divisional hospital under the administrative control of Bihar Govt. Earlier this hospital was under the administrative control of Koshi Project. Local people had started a movement in 2015 to convert it into a sub- divisional hospital for better facilities and in early 2016 got success. There is also one Physiotherapy Clinic equipped with modern equipment and machines, established on 15 July 2013.

== Places of interest ==
=== Koshi barrage ===
It is around 10 km from Gol Chowk, Birpur. It is a flood control sluice across the Koshi river in Mithila region of Nepal. It has 56 gates which controls the flow of water. It is a famous picnic spot for local residents. Koshi Tappu Wildlife Reserve is roughly 3 miles from barrage. Anyone can easily reach there by regular auto from Gol chowk, Birpur

== Research Center ==
A new physical modeling research center is in process, which is the biggest research center of Eastern India.

It will be situated near Patel Park.

=== Indo-Nepal border ===
Birpur is situated near Bhantabari close to Indo-Nepal border.

== Air Transport ==
Rajbiraj Airport (out of india) is the nearest airport roughly 27 KM away in the nearest Nepalese town of Rajbiraj. Shree Airlines operates daily flights between Rajbiraj and Kathmandu

In India, the nearest airports are Bagdogra Airport, close to 205 km. Patna International airport is close to 300 Km from here.

Darbhanga Airport is close to 150 Km from here.

Birpur Airport is not yet a fully operational commercial airport. It’s planned as a new regional airport under India’s UDAN (Ude Desh ka Aam Nagrik) scheme, intended to improve air connectivity for smaller towns in the region.
