= Bhimnagar, Supaul =

Bhimnagar भीमनगर (Hindi)
- Village
- Interactive map of Bhimnagar
- Coordinates: 26°30′51″N 86°57′39″E
- Country: India
- State: Bihar
- District: Supaul
- Elevation: 80 m (260 ft)

Population (2011)
  - Total: 7,688

Languages
  - Official: Maithili, Hindi
- Time zone: UTC+5:30 (IST)
- ISO 3166 code: IN-BR
- Lok Sabha constituency: Supaul
- Vidhan Sabha constituency: Chhatapur

Bhimnagar is a village and an emerging market town in Basantpur tehsil of Supaul district in the Indian state of Bihar. This village is south of the Koshi Barrage and situated on the India-Nepal border and shares its boundary with Bhantabari in Nepal. The population of Bhimnagar is 7,688 and 73.26% literacy rate according to 2011 census of India. Bhimnagar was greatly impacted by the 2008 Bihar flood of the Kosi River.

== Transportation ==
Bhimnagar is connected to NH 131. It is well connected with bus services to Patna and other major cities in Bihar.

Bhimnagar is on India's northern border with Sunsari District, Koshi Province, Nepal, with a border crossing to Bhantabari and the Mahendra Highway, plus a customs checkpoint for essential and other goods.

Rajbiraj Airport, located about 25 km (16 mi) from Bhimnagar, connects it to Nepal's capital city, Kathmandu, while Purnia Airport, located 121 km (75 mi) away, helps connect it to the Indian metropolis. The closest Birpur Airport is under construction and is expected to be completed by the end of 2027.

== Population ==
Bhimnagar 2011 Census Data
Particulars	Total	Male	Female
Total No. of Houses	1,610		
Population	7,688	4,051	3,647
Child (0–6)	1,410	716	694
