= Rajendra Prasad Yadav (Madhepura politician) =

Indian politician

Member of Parliament, Lok Sabha
- In office 1980–1984
- Preceded by: B. P. Mandal
- Succeeded by: Mahabir Prasad Yadav
- In office 1971–1977
- Preceded by: B. P. Mandal
- Succeeded by: B. P. Mandal
- Constituency: Madhepura, Bihar

Personal details
- Born: 29 January 1937 (age 89)
- Party: Indian National Congress
- Other political affiliations: Indian National Congress (U)

Rajendra Prasad Yadav is an Indian politician. He was elected to the lower House of the Indian Parliament the Lok Sabha from Madhepura, Bihar as a member of the Indian National Congress.
