= Ramendra Kumar Yadav =

Indian politician (1943–2021)

Member of Parliament, Rajya Sabha
- In office 1992-2004
- Constituency: Bihar

Member of Parliament, Lok Sabha
- In office 1989-1991
- Preceded by: Mahabir Prasad Yadav
- Succeeded by: Sharad Yadav
- Constituency: Madhepura

Personal details
- Born: 3 January 1943 Chatra, Madhepura district, Bihar, British India
- Died: 14 May 2021 (aged 78)
- Party: Janta Dal (United)
- Other political affiliations: Janata Dal
- Spouse: Mira Yadav

Ramendra Kumar Yadav also called Ravi was an Indian politician. He was a Member of Parliament, representing Bihar in the Rajya Sabha the upper house of India's Parliament.
