= Murho Estate =

Zamindari Estate of British India

- Zamindari
- Mid-18th Century–1949
- Historical era: Modern
  - Established: Mid-18th Century
  - Zamindari Abolition: 1949
| Succeeded by |
| Dominion of India |
- Today part of: Bihar, Republic of India

Murho Estate (mid-18th century to 1947) was a Zamindari (estate) during British Raj in erstwhile Bhagalpur (now in Madhepura) district of Bihar.

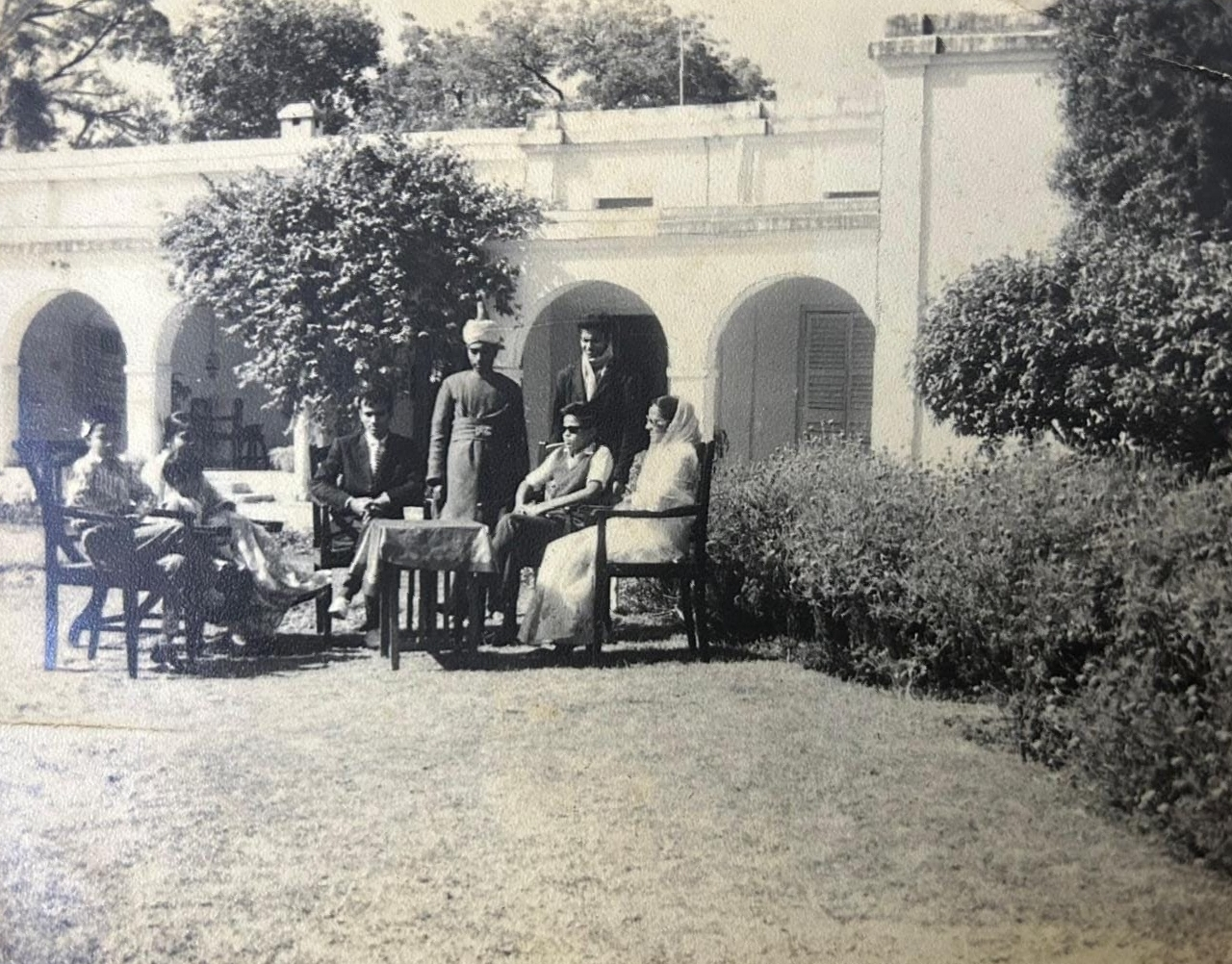
Members of Zamindar family of Murho Estate.

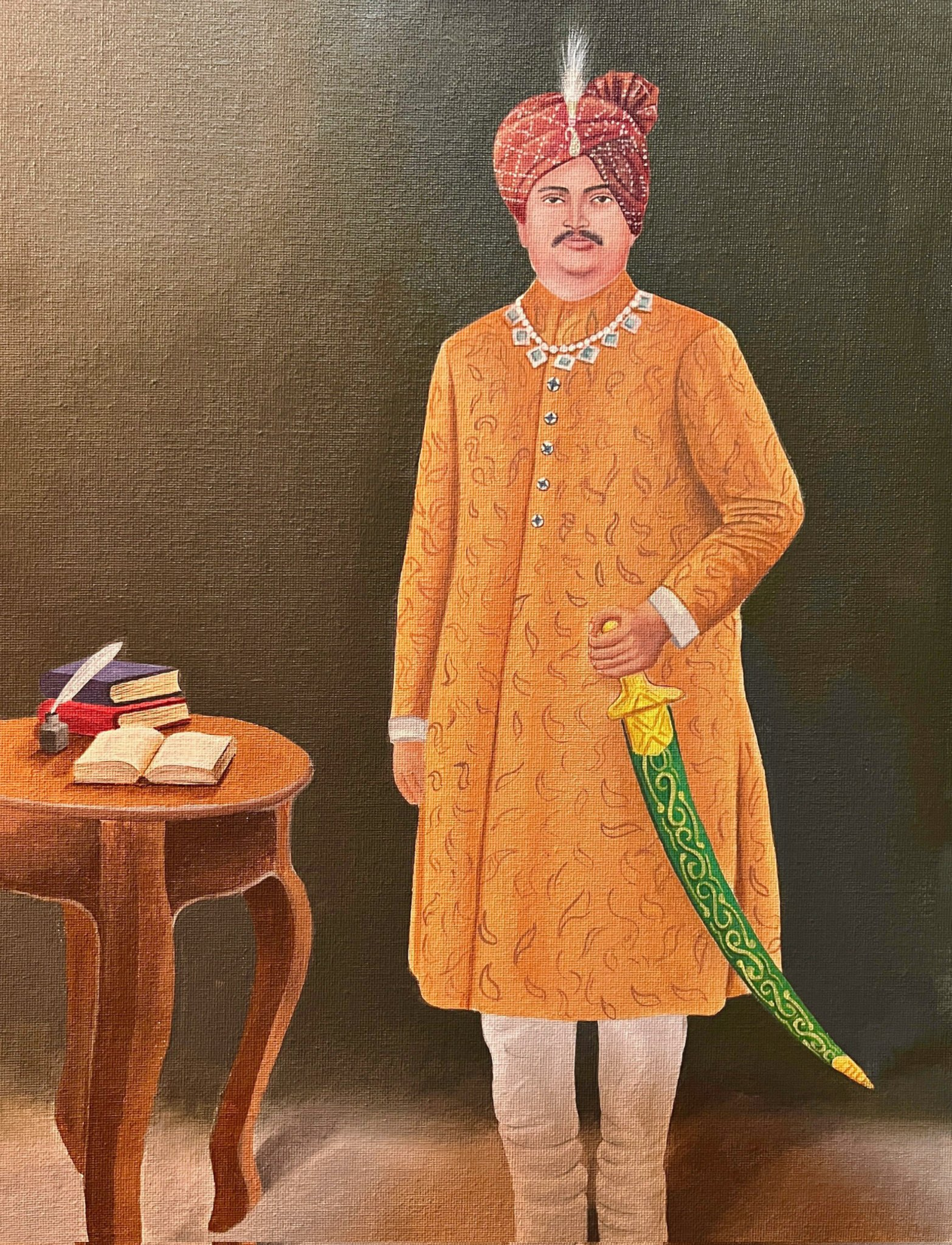
Babu Rash Bihari Lal Mandal.

The name of the estate derives from a Murho village of Madhepura District. Members of the Murho family were notable landlords of the Kosi division.

== History ==
The Murho Zamindari (Estate) was ruled by Majhraut clan of Yadav.

- Rash Bihari Lal Mandal

Babu Rash Bihari Lal was an ardent freedom fighter, social reformer and philanthropist. He became the zamindar of the Murho Estate at a very young age. According to litterateur Dr. Bhupendra Narayan Madhepuri, Rash Bihari Lal was scholarly in many languages like Hindi, Urdu, Persian, Bengali, English, French and Sanskrit.

- Bindheshwari Prasad Mandal

Chairman of Mandal Commission and former Chief Minister of Bihar, Babu B.P. Mandal was born in this zamindar family. He was the son of Zamindar Babu Ras Bihari Lal Mandal.

== List of Zamindars ==
- Babu Rash Bihari lal Mandal (1880-1918), He had three sons, Bhuvneshwari Pd. Mandal, Kamleshwari Pd. Mandal and Bindheshwari Pd. Mandal.
- Babu Bhuvneshwari Prasad Mandal, he took control of zamindari estate after the death of his father Rash Bihari Lal in 1918. He was member of Bihar-Orissa legislative council in 1924.
- Babu Kamleshwari Prasad Mandal, he was member of Bihar legislative council in 1937.
- Babu Bindheshwari Prasad Mandal, Former Chief Minister of Bihar and Chairman of Backward Classes Commission.

== See also ==
- Zamindars of Bihar
