= Udakishunganj subdivision =

Administrative subdivision in Madhepura district, Bihar, India

Udakishunganj उदाकिशुनगंज
- Subdivision
- Location in Bihar, India Udakishunganj (India)
- Coordinates: 25.6716262°N 86.9399368°E
- Country: India
- State: Bihar
- District: Madhepura district
- Headquarters: Udakishunganj

Languages
  - Official: Hindi and Maithili

Regional Language
  - Main: Angika and Maithili
- Time zone: UTC+5:30
- PIN: 852220
- Vehicle registration: BR-43

Udakishunganj is an administrative subdivision of Madhepura district in the state of Bihar, India. It serves as a local administrative centre and has a Sub-Divisional Officer (SDO) based at the subdivision headquarters.

== Geography ==
Udakishunganj subdivision lies in the alluvial plains of northeastern Bihar within the Kosi basin. The subdivision headquarters are located at 25.6716262°N 86.9399368°E.

== Administrative composition ==
The subdivision comprises several community development blocks, together with their constituent panchayats and villages, as administered by the Madhepura district authority. The official Madhepura district website lists Udakishunganj as one of the district's recognised subdivisions.

== Administration and governance ==
The Sub-Divisional Officer (SDO) heads the subdivision administration and coordinates revenue, development and law-and-order functions with block-level officers and line departments. Official contact information and administrative notices are published on the Madhepura district portal.

== Demographics ==
Detailed population and socio-economic statistics for the subdivision are available in the District Census Handbook: Madhepura (2011) produced by the Office of the Registrar General and Census Commissioner, India. The handbook's village and block tables provide figures for population, literacy and social composition.

== Economy ==
Agriculture is the primary economic activity in the subdivision; principal crops include rice, wheat, maize and pulses. Small-scale trade, services and government employment supplement rural incomes. District and central government industrial profiles provide further economic details.

== Transport and infrastructure ==
Udakishunganj is connected by district and state roads to neighbouring blocks and the district headquarters. Regional railheads and highways serving the area are documented in state and project reports.

== Postal and communications ==
The Udakishunganj Sub Office (S.O.) serves the subdivision; the official PIN code is 852220, which falls under the Saharsa postal division (Muzaffarpur region).

== See also ==
- Madhepura district
- Bihar
