= Bhupendra Narayan Mandal =

Indian politician

Member of Parliament, Rajya Sabha
- In office 1966–1975
- Constituency: Bihar

Member of Parliament, Lok Sabha
- In office 1962-1964
- Preceded by: Lalit Narayan Mishra
- Succeeded by: Lahtan Choudhary
- Constituency: Saharsa, Bihar

Personal details
- Born: 1 February 1904 Ranipatti, Madhepura
- Died: 21 July 1975 (aged 71) Kumarkhand, Madhepura
- Party: Samyukta Socialist Party
- Other political affiliations: Praja Socialist Party
- Spouse: Radhavati Yadav

Bhupendra Narayan Mandal (1904–1975) was an Indian politician. He was a Member of Parliament, representing Bihar in the Rajya Sabha the upper house of India's Parliament as a member of the Samyukta Socialist Party

== Biography ==
=== Early life ===
B.N. Mandal was born in 1904 into landowning Vaishnavite Ahir family of Ranipatti Estate in modern-day Madhepura district of Bihar. His father Babu Jainarayan Mandal and mother Dana Devi were traumatized by the death of his two elder brothers. Thus, they were very protective towards him.

=== Death ===
Bhupendra Mandal took his last breath on 29 May 1975 at Tengraha in Kumarkhand block of Madhepura.
