= Rash Bihari Lal Mandal =

Indian zamindar and politician from Bihar

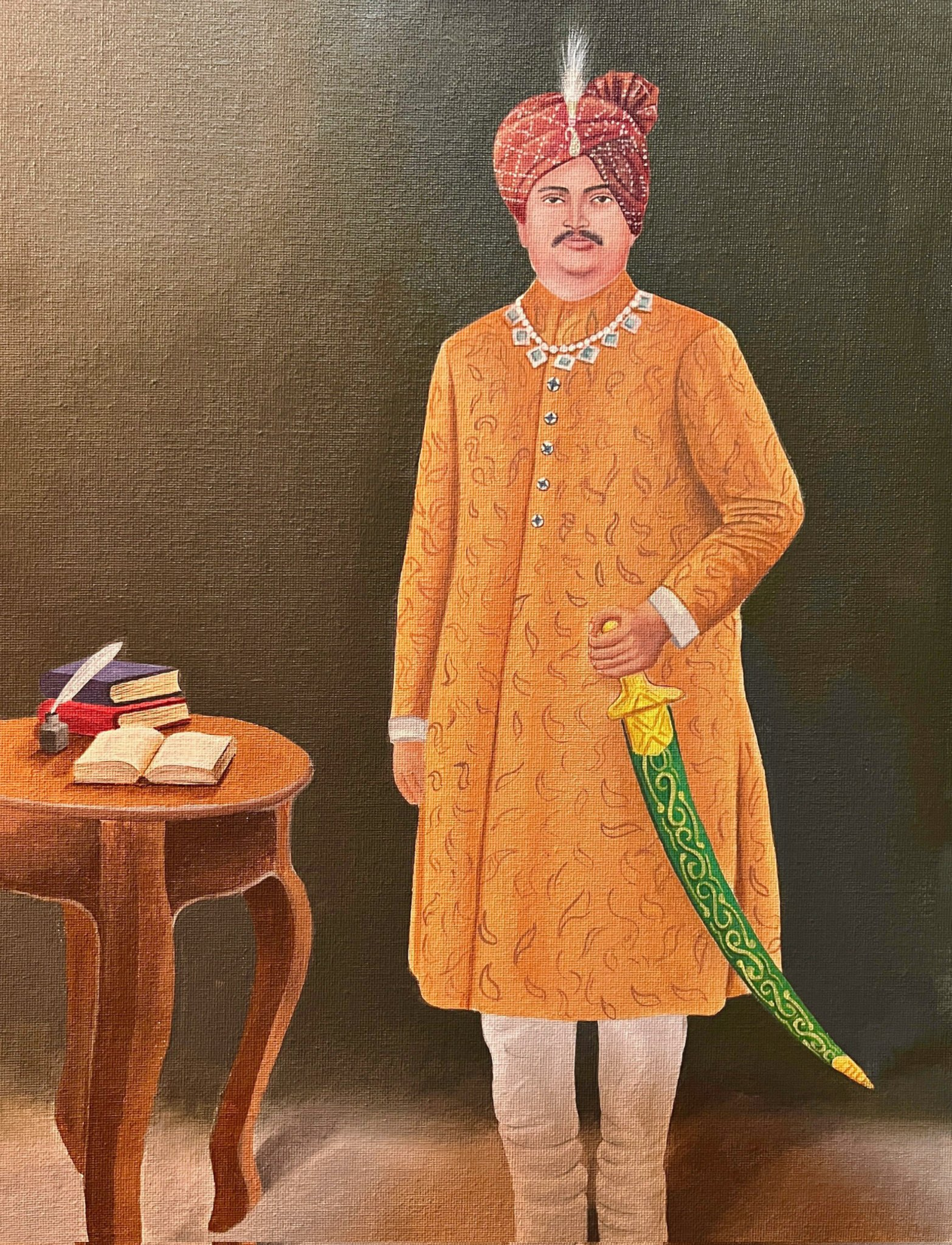

Zamindar of Madhepura
- Reign: 1885-1918
- Predecessor: Babu Raghuvar Dayal Mandal
- Successor: Babu Bindheshwari Prasad Mandal (also known as B.P. Mandal)
- Born: 1866; Madhepura, Bhagalpur District, Bengal Presidency, British India (later Bihar, India)
- Died: 26 August 1918 (aged 51–52); Varanasi, British India (later Uttar Pradesh, India)
- Spouse: Sitawati Mandal
- Issue: B. P. Mandal
- House: Murho Estate
- Father: Raghuvar Dayal Mandal
- Religion: Hinduism

Raja Rash Bihari Lal Mandal (1866-1918) was a zamindar (Indian feudal lord) and a leader of Indian Independence Movement. He wrote a book named "Bharat Mata Ka Sandesh" during the 1905 partition of Bengal.

== Biography ==
He was born in 1866 as the only son of Raghuvar Dayal Mandal, a Ahir zamindar of Murho Estate. He was only a few years old when his parents died. After which he was brought up by his maternal grandmother in Ranipatti. He studied till 11th standard and had knowledge of Hindi, Urdu, Maithili, Sanskrit, Persian, English, and French. At young age, he took control of the zamindari estate of Murho. He was married to Sitavati Mandal, they had three sons, Bhuvaneshwari Prasad Mandal, Kamleshwari Prasad Mandal and Bindheshwari Prasad Mandal.

Mandal was one of the founding members of the Congress Party in Bihar and had been an elected member of the Bihar Provincial Congress Committee and the All-India Congress Committee from 1908 to 1918. He was one of the delegates of Bihar to the 25th Session of Indian National Congress at Allahabad in 1910.

Rashbihari Lal was one of the few zamindar of Bihar to launch an attack on the British. He participated in many agitations against the British, due to which more than 120 cases were filed against him by the British. Despite being anti-British, In 1911, Rash Bihari Lal Mandal was given a prestigious place in the Delhi Durbar of Emperor George V's coronation in India.

In 1911, he founded the Gop Jatiya Mahasabha. Later the All-India Yadav Mahasabha was formed by merging the Gop Jatiye Mahasabha and other regional organization of Ahirs.

He died of illness on 26 August 1918 in Banaras, at the age of 52.
