= Kosi division =

Administrative division in Bihar, India

- Division of Bihar
- Location of Kosi division in Bihar
- Coordinates: 25.88°N 86.6°E
- Country: India
- State: Bihar
- Headquarters: Saharsa
- Districts: Saharsa, Madhepura and Supaul

Population (2011)
  - Total: 12,120,117

Kosi division is an administrative geographical unit of Bihar state of India. Saharsa is the administrative headquarters of the division. Currently (2022), the division consists of Saharsa district, Madhepura district, and Supaul district.

== Economy ==
=== Agriculture ===
It is the major producer of Corn and Makhana in India. Every year tonnes of corn and makhana are disseminated throughout the entire country by railways and airways. The following crops are grown in the region: Makhana (Euryale ferox Salisb), rice, mangoes, litchi, bamboo, mustard, corn, wheat and sugarcane. Sagwan or teak (Tectona grandis) trees are now grown on a large scale.

== History ==
Present-day Kosi division, all of which was previously part of Saharsa district, is part of the Mithila region. Mithila first gained prominence after being settled by Indo-Aryan peoples who established the Mithila Kingdom (also called Kingdom of the Videhas). During the late Vedic period (c. 1100–500 BCE), Kingdom of the Videhas became one of the major political and cultural centres of South Asia, along with Kuru and Pañcāla. The kings of the Kingdom of the Videhas were called Janakas. The Mithila Kingdom was later incorporated into the Vajjika League, which had its capital in the city of Vaishali, which is also in Mithila.

== Language ==
The predominant language spoken in this region is Hindi and Maithili language. The most common dialect of Maithili used in Kosi division is Thēthi dialect.

== See also ==
- Districts of Bihar
