= B. P. Mandal =

Indian parliamentarian who chaired the Mandal Commission

Bindheshwari Prasad Mandal
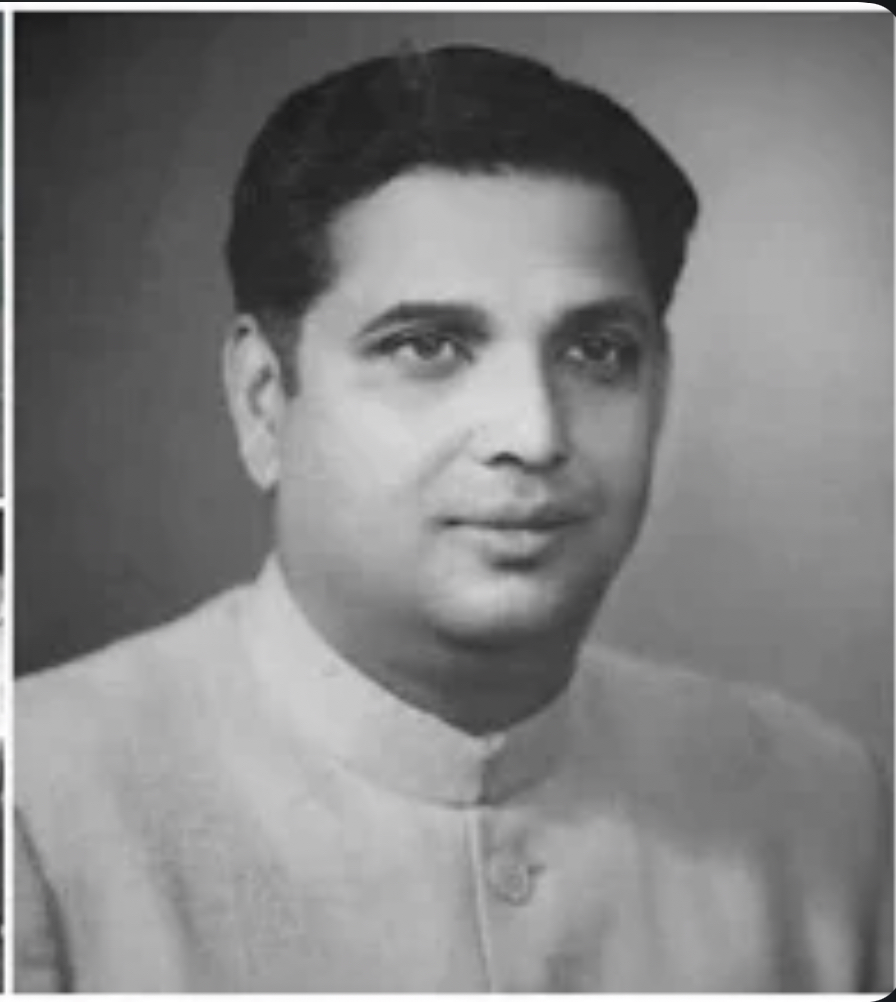

7th Chief Minister of Bihar
- In office 1 February 1968 – 2 March 1968
- Preceded by: Satish Prasad Singh
- Succeeded by: Bhola Paswan Shastri

Member of Parliament, Lok Sabha
- In office 1967–1972
- Succeeded by: Rajendra Prasad Yadav
- Constituency: Madhepura
- In office 1977–1980
- Preceded by: Rajendra Prasad Yadav
- Succeeded by: Rajendra Prasad Yadav

Personal details
- Born: 25 August 1918
- Died: 13 April 1982 (aged 63)
- Parent: Rash Bihari Lal Mandal (father)

Babu Bindheshwari Prasad Mandal (25 August 1918 – 13 April 1982) was a scion of the erstwhile Murho Estate and an Indian politician who chaired the Mandal Commission. Mandal came from a rich Yadav landlord family from Madhepura in Northern Bihar. He served as the seventh Chief Minister of Bihar in 1968, but he resigned after 30 days. As a parliamentarian, he served as the chairman of the Second Backward Classes Commission, popularly known as the Mandal Commission. The commission's report mobilised a segment of the Indian population known as "Other Backward Classes" (OBCs) and initiated a fierce debate on policies related to underrepresented and underprivileged groups in Indian politics.

== Early life ==
Bindhyeshwari Prasad Mandal, more commonly known as B.P. Mandal, was born on 25 August 1918 in Varanasi, Uttar Pradesh. His mother was Sitawati Mandal. His father was Rash Bihari Lal Mandal, a zamindar (landlord) of the Murho estate, situated in the Madhepura sub-division of Bhagalpur district in Bihar.

== Political career ==
In 1941, at the age of 23, he became a member of the Bhagalpur district council. In 1952, during the first general elections for the state assembly of Bihar, Mandal won the Madhepura assembly seat on a Congress ticket against Bhupendra Narayan Mandal from the Socialist Party. B. P. Mandal always considered Narayan Mandal as influential in formulating socialist notions and establishing Madhepura as a place for promotion of socialism. In Pama, local Rajput landlords of the Pama village in Bihar attacked a Kurmi village, leading to police atrocities against backward-class citizens; Mandal made headlines in newspapers all across the nation for requesting immediate government action against the police and compensation for victims during the Bihar assembly session. Pressure to rescind his request caused him to move to the opposition bench and fight for the cause, which humiliated the ruling party. Impressed by his actions, Ram Manohar Lohia made him president of his Samyukta Socialist Party. Subsequently, he fought and won Lok Sabha elections in Bihar on the ticket of the Samyukta Socialist Party and was appointed to head the Ministry of Health in State Government.

Later, he left the Samyukta Socialist Party due to differences with Lohia and formed a new party called Shoshit Dal, in March 1967. He took the oath as the seventh Chief Minister of Bihar on 1 February 1968. However, as he was member of the Lower House, he was required to be a member of the Bihar Assembly to continue in the post of Chief Minister. Satish Singh, an MLA of his party, was made Chief Minister for four days before Mandal became a member of the Legislative Council and took charge as Chief Minister again. It was during this time that the ministry comprised primarily representatives from OBCs rather than upper castes. Though the government lasted only 47 days, this radical shift in the representation paradigm brought a new spirit in Indian politics. Mandal had to resign as Chief Minister after serving for only 30 days, protesting Congress's removal of the Aiyar Commission headed by T. L. Venkatrama Aiyar, to cater to charges of corruption against several ministers and senior Congress leaders. He became a Lok Sabha member again in 1968 when he contested and won by-elections again from Madhepura parliamentary constituency without much challenge. Mandal teamed up with Jayaprakash Narayan and resigned from the Bihar Assembly, protesting a corrupt Congress administration. In 1977, he contested Lok Sabha elections from Madhepura constituency on a Janata Party ticket and won, serving until 1979.

=== Civil rights commission ===
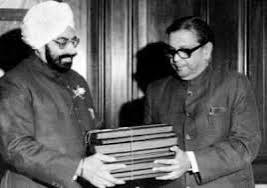
B.P Mandal submitting the report of the second Backward Classes commission to the then President Giani Zail Singh

In December 1978, Prime Minister Morarji Desai appointed a five-member civil rights commission, with Mandal as chairman. Mandal's longstanding support for the depressed classes resulted in the formation of this commission, popularly known as the "Mandal Commission" or "Backward Classes Commission". The commission's report was completed in 1980 and recommended that a significant proportion of all government and educational places be reserved for applicants from the Other Backward Classes. While it is alleged that some of these communities are themselves landlords like yadav, jat, gurjar it has no empirical basis to prove the same. The reservation is based on social and economic backwardness of the enlisted communities who have been treated as service castes in ritual Hindu varna system. While BP Mandal himself was a landlord in madhepura, Bihar of murho estate the evidence of land ownership across the caste is very weak and there has been no effort by the government to map the caste and resource ownership in India.

The commission's report was shelved indefinitely by Prime Minister Indira Gandhi. A decade later, Prime Minister V. P. Singh implemented the recommendations of the Mandal Report, leading to what is now known as the caste-reservation system in India, which came into effect in 1993 after the Supreme Court gave a go-ahead for its implementation in a historic November 1992 judgement known as Indra Sawhney.

The Mandal commission was not well received by a number of upper-caste communities, leading to nation-wide protests and uproar. Upper caste students self-immolated themselves. Students from the upper caste saw their educational opportunities under threat; many of the people from these castes continue to consider the policies to be unnecessary and biased.

== Commemoration ==
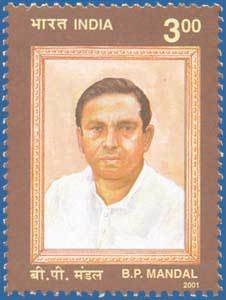
Indian Postage Stamp of B P Mnadal, 2001

Various statues and memorials were made in his memory in the state, and one of the most significant ones stands in front of the governor's house in Patna. His birthday is celebrated annually in a formal ceremony led by his son, Manindra Kumar Mandal, other family members in their village, and the Chief Minister and other cabinet members of the state in Patna, Sasaram, and various other places.

== See also ==
- List of chief ministers of Bihar
