= Madhepura district =

District in Bihar, India

Coordinates: 25°54′36″N 86°46′48″E

- District of Bihar
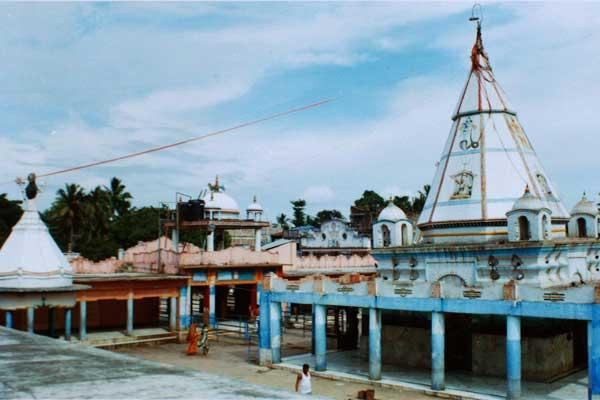
- Singheshwar Sthan in Singheshwar

- Location of Madhepura district in Bihar
- Country: India
- State: Bihar
- Region: Mithila
- Division: Kosi
- Headquarters: Madhepura

Government
  - Lok Sabha constituencies: Madhepura
  - Vidhan Sabha constituencies: Alamnagar, Bihariganj, Singheshwar, Madhepura

Area
  - Total: 1,787 km^{2} (690 sq mi)

Population (2011)
  - Total: 2,001,762
  - Density: 1,120/km^{2} (2,901/sq mi)

Demographics
  - Literacy: 53.78 per cent
  - Sex ratio: 914
- Time zone: UTC+05:30 (IST)
- Major highways: NH 106
- HDI (2016): ▲0.110 (low)
- Website: madhepura.nic.in

Madhepura district is one of the thirty-eight districts of Bihar state, India, and Madhepura town is the administrative headquarters of this district. Madhepura district is a part of Kosi division. This district belongs to the Mithila region. Maithili is the main language here.

== History ==
Madhepura district is part of the Kosi—Seemanchal subregion of Mithila region of Bihar and the people here speak the Maithili language.

Madhepura was a part of Maurya Empire, this fact is asserted by the Mauryan pillar at Uda-kishunganj.

During British Raj, the district of Madhepura was dominated by the Yadav Zamindars of Murho Estate, who were the biggest landlords of the district.

Madhepura district as it stands now was carved out of Saharsa district and got the status of revenue district on 9 May 1981. Prior to that, Madhepura was a sub-division under Bhagalpur district with effect from 3 September 1845. It was on 1 April 1954 that Saharsa district was carved out with three subdivision Saharsa, Madhepura and Supaul of Bhagalpur district. The munsif court was established in 1865 at Madhepura, earlier it was in Kishanganj. Sub Judge Court was established here in 1944.

== Geography ==
Madhepura district occupies an area of 1,788 square kilometres (690 sq mi), comparatively equivalent to Russia's Bolshoy Shantar Island. Madhepura district is surrounded by Araria and Supaul district in the north, Khagaria and Bhagalpur district in the south, Purnia district in the east and Saharsa district in the West. It is situated in the Plains of River Koshi and located in the Northeastern part of Bihar at latitude between 25°. 34 to 26°.07' and longitude between 86° .19' to 87°.07'.

The district has 2 sub-divisions - Madhepura and Udakishunganj, 13 blocks, 13 police stations, 170 panchayats and 434 revenue villages. The total population of Madhepura, as per census of the year 2001 is 15,24,596 of which 7,96,272 are male and 7,29,324 are female. Literacy rate is 36.9% as against the national rate of 64.8% and state rate of 47%. The density of population is 859 per km^{2}.

=== Climate ===
The maximum temperature of this district ranges from 35 to 45 °C (95 to 113 °F) and the minimum temperature varies from 7 to 9 °C (45 to 48 °F). The average rainfall in this district is 1,300 mm (51 in).

== Politics ==
District	No.	Constituency	Name	Party	Alliance	Remarks
Madhepura	70	Alamnagar	Narendra Narayan Yadav	JD(U)	NDA	Deputy Speaker
Madhepura	71	Bihariganj	Niranjan Kumar Mehta	JD(U)	NDA	
Madhepura	72	Singheshwar (SC)	Ramesh Rishidev	JD(U)	NDA	
Madhepura	73	Madhepura	Chandrashekhar Yadav	RJD	MGB	

== Economy ==
In 2006 the Ministry of Panchayati Raj named Madhepura one of the country's 250 most backward districts (out of a total of 640). It is one of the 36 districts in Bihar currently receiving funds from the Backward Regions Grant Fund Programme (BRGF).

An electric locomotive factory has been set up at Madhepura by the Indian Railways in a joint venture with Alstom SA of France. The factory has the distinction of manufacturing the most powerful railway engine in India, the WAG-12.

== Sub-divisions ==
Madhepura district comprises the following Sub-Divisions:

- Madhepura
- Udakishunganj

=== Blocks ===
- Madhepura
- Ghelardh
- Singheshwar
- Gamhariya
- Shankarpur
- Kumarkhand
- Murliganj
- Gwalpara
- Bihariganj
- Udakishunganj
- Puraini
- Alamnagar
- Chousa

== Demographics ==
Historical population
Year	Pop.	±% p.a.
1901	429,692	—
1911	442,985	+0.31%
1921	427,735	−0.35%
1931	452,600	+0.57%
1941	456,140	+0.08%
1951	528,845	+1.49%
1961	642,346	+1.96%
1971	774,477	+1.89%
1981	964,033	+2.21%
1991	1,177,706	+2.02%
2001	1,526,646	+2.63%
2011	2,001,762	+2.75%

Religions in Madhepura district (2011)
Religion	Percent
Hinduism	87.61%
Islam	12.08%
Other or not stated	0.31%

According to the 2011 census Madhepura district has a population of 2,001,762, roughly equal to the nation of Slovenia. This gives it a ranking of 232nd in India (out of a total of 640). The district has a population density of 1,116 inhabitants per square kilometre (2,890/sq mi) . Its population growth rate over the decade 2001-2011 was 30.65%. Madhepura has a sex ratio of 914 females for every 1000 males, and a literacy rate of 53.78%. 4.42% of the population lives in urban areas. Scheduled Castes and Scheduled Tribes make up 17.30% and 0.63% of the population respectively.

Languages of Madhepura district (2011)
1. Maithili (38.4%)
2. Hindi (37.1%)
3. 'Other' Hindi (18.0%)
4. Urdu (5.71%)
5. Others (0.67%)

At the time of the 2011 Census of India, 38.43% of the population spoke Maithili, 37.15% Hindi and 5.71% Urdu as their first language. 18.04% were classified as speaking a language under 'Other' Hindi in the census. Around 25% of total population of the district are of Yadav caste.

== Government institutions and courts ==
Governmental institutions in Madhepura include:

- Municipal Corporation
- Collectorate
- Office of the Divisional Commissioner
- District Court, Madhepura
- Urban Improvement Trust (UIT)

== Health services ==
Healthcare is provided by a combination of public and private-sector hospitals.

- Sadar Hospital, Madhepura
- Madhipura Christian Hospital.

== Education ==
834 Govt. schools are imparting education in the district. Bhupendra Narayan Mandal University is situated at the district headquarter, Madhepura and contributing to the educational atmosphere of this district.

=== List of educational institutes ===
- B.N.Mandal University Mahepura
- P.Sc.College,
- Jawahar Navodaya vidyalaya,
- Kiran Public School, Holy Cross, Holy angels, (Website)
- B R Oxford Residential Public School, Murliganj Madhepura (Website)
- SAMIDHA GROUP
- DeiGratia International School, Tuniyahi Uttarwari, Madhepura, Bihar.()

== Media ==
The Radio Stations are following:

=== Newspapers ===
- YTR NEWS
- Dainik Jagran
- Dainik Bhaskar
- Hindustan
- Madhepura Times
- Prabhat Khabar

== Notable person ==
- Rash Bihari Lal Mandal, Zamindar of Murho Estate.
- Kamleshwari Prasad Yadav, politician
- B.P. Mandal, 7th Chief Minister of Bihar and chairman of the Second Backward Classes Commission (popularly known as the Mandal Commission).
