= Madhepura Lok Sabha constituency =

Lok Sabha constituency in Bihar

Coordinates: 25.9°N 86.8°E

Madhepura
- Lok Sabha constituency

Constituency details
- Country: India
- Region: East India
- State: Bihar
- District: Madhepura
- Lok Sabha constituency: Madhepura
- Established: 1967
- Reservation: None

Member of Parliament
- 18th Lok Sabha
- Incumbent Dinesh Chandra Yadav
- Party: JD(U)
- Alliance: NDA
- Elected year: 2019
- Preceded by: RJD Pappu Yadav

Madhepura is one of the 40 Lok Sabha constituencies in Bihar state in eastern India.

Sharad Yadav started his political innings in his home state of Madhya Pradesh in 1970s, but he later made Madhepura his base, winning from here 4 times and losing 4 times. He won from here in 1991, 1996, (lost to Lalu Prasad Yadav in 1998), 1999 (defeating Lalu), (lost to Lalu in 2004), won again in 2009. He lost in 2014 and then again 2019, both times falling to Modi wave.

== Vidhan Sabha segments ==
After the delimitation in 2009, presently Madhepura constituency comprises the following six Vidhan Sabha segments:

#	Name	District	Member	Party	2024 lead
70	Alamnagar	Madhepura	Narendra Narayan Yadav	JD(U)	JD(U)
71	Bihariganj	Madhepura	Niranjan Mehta	JD(U)	JD(U)
73	Madhepura	Madhepura	Chandrashekhar Yadav	RJD	RJD
74	Sonbarsha (SC)	Saharsa	Ratnesh Sada	JD(U)	JD(U)
75	Saharsa	Saharsa	Indrajeet Prasad Gupta	IIP	JD(U)
77	Mahishi	Saharsa	Gautam Krishna Yadav	RJD	JD(U)

== Members of Parliament ==
Year	Name	Party
1967	B. P. Mandal	Samyukta Socialist Party
1968^	B. P. Mandal	Independent
1971	Rajendra Prasad Yadav	Indian National Congress
1977	B. P. Mandal	Janata Party
1980	Rajendra Prasad Yadav	Indian National Congress (U)
1984	Mahabir Prasad Yadav	Indian National Congress
1989	Ramendra Kumar Yadav	Janata Dal
1991	Sharad Yadav	Janata Dal
1996	Sharad Yadav	Janata Dal
1998	Lalu Prasad Yadav	Rashtriya Janata Dal
1999	Sharad Yadav	Janata Dal (United)
2004	Lalu Prasad Yadav	Rashtriya Janata Dal
2004^	Pappu Yadav	Rashtriya Janata Dal
2009	Sharad Yadav	Janata Dal (United)
2014	Pappu Yadav	Rashtriya Janata Dal
2019	Dinesh Chandra Yadav	Janata Dal (United)
2024	Dinesh Chandra Yadav	Janata Dal (United)

^ by-poll

== Election results ==
=== 2024 ===
2024 Indian general elections: Madhepura
Party	Candidate	Votes	%	±%
JD(U)	Dinesh Chandra Yadav	640,649	52.96	
RJD	Kumar Chandradeep	4,66,115	38.53	
NOTA	None of the Above	32,625	2.70	
Majority		1,74,534	14.43	
Turnout		12,09,822	58.34	
JD(U) hold		Swing		

=== 2019 ===
2019 Indian general elections: Madhepura
Party	Candidate	Votes	%	±%
JD(U)	Dinesh Chandra Yadav	624,334	54.42	
RJD	Sharad Yadav	3,22,807	28.14	
JAP(L)	Pappu Yadav	97,631	8.51	
NOTA	None of the Above	38,450	3.35	
Majority		3,01,527	26.28	
Turnout		11,47,652	60.89	
JD(U) gain from RJD		Swing		

=== 2014 Lok Sabha Election ===
2014 Indian general elections: Madhepura
Party	Candidate	Votes	%	±%
RJD	Pappu Yadav	3,68,937	35.65	
JD(U)	Sharad Yadav	3,12,728	30.22	
BJP	Vijay Kumar Singh	2,52,534	24.40	
NOTA	None of the Above	21,924	2.11	
BSP	Gulzar Kumar	18,084	1.74	
Independent	Rajo Sah	12,247		
Majority		56,209		
Turnout		10,34,799	59.96	
RJD gain from JD(U)		Swing		

=== 2009 Lok Sabha Election ===
2009 Indian general elections: Madhepura
Party	Candidate	Votes	%	±%
JD(U)	Sharad Yadav	3,70,585	48.99	+9.56
RJD	Prof. Ravindra Charan Yadav	1,92,964	25.51	−23.98
INC	Dr. Tara Nand Sada	67,803	8.96	+8.96
CPI	Om Prakash Narayan	28,112	3.72	+3.72
Independent	Kishor Kumar	19,946	2.46	+2.46
Independent	Mahadeo Yadav	12,657	1.67	+1.67
Independent	Saakar Suresh Yadav	9,206	1.22	+1.22
RJP	Dhanoj Kumar Tanti	9,180	1.21	+1.21
BSP	Binod Kumar Jha	8,467	1.12	−1.92
Samata Party	N.K. Singh	6,667	0.88	−0.51
Majority		1,77,621	23.48	+13.42
Turnout		7,56,450	50.17	+4.98
JD(U) gain from RJD		Swing	+9.56	

=== 2004 Lok Sabha Election ===
2004 Indian general elections: Madhepura
Party	Candidate	Votes	%	±%
RJD	Lalu Prasad Yadav	3,44,301	49.49	
JD(U)	Sharad Yadav	2,74,314	39.43	
BSP	Arvind Sah	21,152	3.04	
Independent	Satto Mandal	11,673	1.68	
Samata Party	N.K. Singh	9,685	1.39	
SP	Anant Lal Sada	8,493	1.22	
Independent	Prasanna Kumar	6,475	0.93	
Majority		69,987	10.06	
Turnout		6,95,674	45.19	
RJD hold		Swing		

==== 2004 bye-election ====
- Pappu Yadav (RJD) : 365,948 votes
- Rajendra Prasad Yadav (JD-U) : 157,088

=== 1999 Lok Sabha Election ===
- Sharad Yadav (JD(U)) : 328,761 votes
- Lalu Prasad Yadav (RJD) : 298,441

== See also ==
- Khagaria district
- List of constituencies of the Lok Sabha
