= Madhepura =

Municipality in Bihar, India

- Town
- Nickname: India's Electric Loco Capital
- West By-pass Road, Bihar, India
- Coordinates: 25.920°N 86.792°E
- Country: India
- State: Bihar
- Region: Mithila
- District: Madhepura

Government
  - Type: Municipal Council
  - Body: Madhepura Municipal Council

Area
  - Total: 26 km^{2} (10 sq mi)

Population (2011)
  - Total: 70,000 (estimated)
  - Density: 2,700/km^{2} (7,000/sq mi)

Languages
  - Official: Hindi
  - Additional official: English
  - Regional: Maithili
- Time zone: UTC+5:30 (IST)
- PIN: 852113
- ISO 3166 code: IN-BR
- Vehicle registration: BR-43
- Lok Sabha constituency: Madhepura
- Vidhan Sabha constituency: Madhepura
- Website: madhepura.bih.nic.in

Madhepura is a municipality in Madhepura district in the Indian state of Bihar. It stands at the centre of the Kosi ravine. It was called Madhyapura- a place centrally situated, which was subsequently transformed into Madhipura, present Madhepura. It is surrounded by Araria and Supaul districts in the north, Khagaria and Bhagalpur districts in the south, Purnia district in the east and Saharsa district in the West. Baba Singheshwar Sthan, a famous Shiva temple and pilgrimage site, is located in Madhepura district and attracts devotees, especially during the month of Shravan.

== History ==
Madhepura is part of the Mithila region and the people here speak the Maithili language. Mithila first gained prominence after being settled by Indo-Aryan peoples who established the Mithila Kingdom (also called Kingdom of the Videhas). During the late Vedic period (c. 1100–500 BCE), Videha became one of the major political and cultural centres of South Asia, along with Kuru and Pañcāla. The kings of the Videha Kingdom were called Janakas. The Videha Kingdom was later incorporated into the Vajjika League, which had its capital in the city of Vaishali, which is also in Mithila.

== Demographics ==
As of 2001, India census, Madhepura had a population of 45,015. Males constitute 55% of the population and females 45%. Madhepura has an average literacy rate of 62%, higher than the national average of 59.5%: male literacy is 71%, and female literacy is 51%. In Madhepura, 15% of the population is under 6 years of age.

== Transport ==
Public and private bus and taxi services are available.

=== Rail ===
Dauram Madhepura is situated on the Saharsa–Purnia line. There are three pairs of passenger trains to Purnia, Barhara Kothi & Saharsa Junction. There are direct trains to Patna Junction, Darbhanga, Jaynagar, Katihar, Ranchi, Delhi, Amritsar, Sealdah.

=== Road ===
NH 231 and NH 131 passes through Madhepura. NH-231 goes through Purnia, Saharsa & Maheskhunt, while NH-131 goes through Birpur and Bihpur. There is daily bus service to Purnia, Saharsa, Supaul, Darbhanga & Patna.

=== Air ===
Nearest airport is Purnea Airport, Purnea. (80 km)

Madhepura to Purnea Airport

== Educational institution ==
- Bhupendra Narayan Mandal University
- Jannayak Karpuri Thakur Medical College and Hospital
- BP Mandal College of Engineering, Madhepura
- T P College, Madhepura
- P S College, Madhepura
- B P S INTER AND DEGREE COLLEGE BABHANGAMA BIHARIGANJ MADHEPURA
- BNMV College, Madhepura
- SNMP High School, Madhepura
- K.K.P.K High School,Rajni Babhangama Madhepura
- Keshav Kanya High School, Madhepura
- Jawahar Navoday Vidyalay Madhepura

== Social Group ==
- The Madhepura Index On X(Twitter)

== See also ==
- [The Electric Locomotive Factory, Madhepura is a joint venture of Alstom SA of France with Indian Railways for the production of 800 high-power locomotives over a period of 11 years, designed to run on Indian tracks at 120 km/h (75 mph). The manufacturing has started on 11 October 2017.] [PUBLICEDBY-BABA ANKIT
- Madhepura (Community development block)
