= List of subdivisions of Bihar =

List of administrative subdivisions of Bihar, India

Administrative Division in Details
- Divisions: 9
- Districts: 38
- Subdivisions: 101
- Blocks: 534
- Gram Panchayats: 8,406
- Villages: 45,103

Subdivisions of Bihar
- Category: Administrative division of Districts
- Location: Bihar
- Number: 101
- Government: Government of Bihar

Subdivision is an administrative unit below district level and above the block level in every state of India. A district may have one or more subdivisions. Presently, there are 101 subdivisions in 38 districts of Bihar. Subdivisions consist of a group of blocks, which are administered by a Sub-divisional Officer (SDO), also called a Sub-divisional Magistrate (SDM). The SDM performs functions similar to that of the District Magistrate (DM) at the subdivision level. SDMs and DMs are members of either the Indian Administrative Service (IAS) or the Bihar Administrative Service (BAS), with the majority belonging to the IAS.

There are 853 police stations in 40 Police Districts of Bihar. Police Districts are usually headed by a Senior superintendent of police (SSP) or a Superintendent of Police (SP). A Police District is divided into Police Subdivisions, headed by a Deputy Superintendent of Police (DSP). All these Bihar Police officers are members of either the Indian Police Service (IPS) or the Bihar Police Service (BPS). These Police Districts are different from the 38 administrative or revenue districts of Bihar.

== List of subdivisions of Bihar ==
Districts	Subdivisions
Araria	Araria
Araria	Forbesganj
Arwal	Arwal
Aurangabad	Aurangabad
Aurangabad	Daudnagar
Banka	Banka
Begusarai	Begusarai
Begusarai	Manjhaul
Begusarai	Ballia
Begusarai	Bakhari
Begusarai	Teghara
Bhagalpur	Bhagalpur
Bhagalpur	Kahalgaon
Bhagalpur	Naugachhia
Bhojpur	Arrah
Bhojpur	Jagdishpur
Bhojpur	Piro
Buxar	Buxar
Buxar	Dumraon
Darbhanga	Darbhanga
Darbhanga	Benipur
Darbhanga	Biraul
East Champaran	Motihari
East Champaran	Areraj
East Champaran	Raxaul
East Champaran	Sikarahna
East Champaran	Pakridayal
East Champaran	Mehsi/Chakia
Gaya	Gaya sadar
Gaya	Neemchak Bathani
Gaya	Sherghati
Gaya	Tekari
Gopalganj	Gopalganj
Gopalganj	Hathua
Jamui	Jamui
Jehanabad	Jehanabad
Kaimur	Bhabhua
Kaimur	Mohania
Katihar	Katihar
Katihar	Barsoi
Katihar	Manihari
Khagaria	Khagaria
Khagaria	Gogri
Kishanganj	Kishanganj
Lakhisarai	Lakhisarai
Madhepura	Madhepura
Madhepura	Udakishunganj
Madhubani	Madhubani
Madhubani	Jainagar
Madhubani	Benipatti
Madhubani	Jhanjharpur
Madhubani	Phul Paraas
Munger	Munger Sadar
Munger	Haveli Kharagpur
Munger	Tarapur
Muzaffarpur	Muzaffarpur East
Muzaffarpur	Muzaffarpur West
Nalanda	Bihar Sharif
Nalanda	Rajgir
Nalanda	Hilsa
Nawada	Nawada
Nawada	Rajauli
Patna	Patna Sadar
Patna	Patna City
Patna	Barh
Patna	Danapur
Patna	Masaurhi
Patna	Paliganj
Purnia	Purnia Sadar
Purnia	Banmankhi
Purnia	Dhamdaha
Purnia	Baisi
Rohtas	Sasaram
Rohtas	Bikramganj
Rohtas	Dehri
Saharsa	Saharsa Sadar
Saharsa	Simri Bakhtiyarpur
Samastipur	Samastipur
Samastipur	Dalsinghsarai
Samastipur	Rosera
Samastipur	Patori
Saran	Chhapra
Saran	Marhaura
Saran	Sonepur
Sheikhpura	Sheikhpura
Sheohar	Sheohar
Sitamarhi	Sitamarhi Sadar
Sitamarhi	Belsand
Sitamarhi	Pupri
Siwan	Siwan Sadar
Siwan	Maharajganj
Supaul	Supaul Sadar
Supaul	Birpur
Supaul	Nirmali
Supaul	Triveniganj
Vaishali	Hajipur
Vaishali	Mahnar
Vaishali	Mahua
West Champaran	Bettiah
West Champaran	Bagaha
West Champaran	Narkatiaganj

== See also ==
- Government of Bihar
- Administration in Bihar
- Cities in Bihar
- Districts of Bihar
- Interactive map of Bihar's District
- Divisions of India
- Blocks in Bihar
- Villages in Bihar
