= Chandra Kishore Pathak =

Indian politician

Member of Parliament, Lok Sabha
- In office 1984-1989
- Preceded by: Kamal Nath Jha
- Succeeded by: Surya Narayan Yadav
- Constituency: Saharsa, Bihar

Personal details
- Born: 1915 Karnpur, Supaul district, Bihar, British India
- Died: 2 July 1998 Karnpur, Bihar, India
- Party: Indian National Congress

Chandra Kishore Pathak (1915 – 2 July 1998) was an Indian politician. He was a Member of Parliament, representing Saharsa, Bihar in the Lok Sabha the lower house of India's Parliament as a member of the Indian National Congress.
