= Tintoliya Durga Mandir =

Hindu temple in Bihar, India

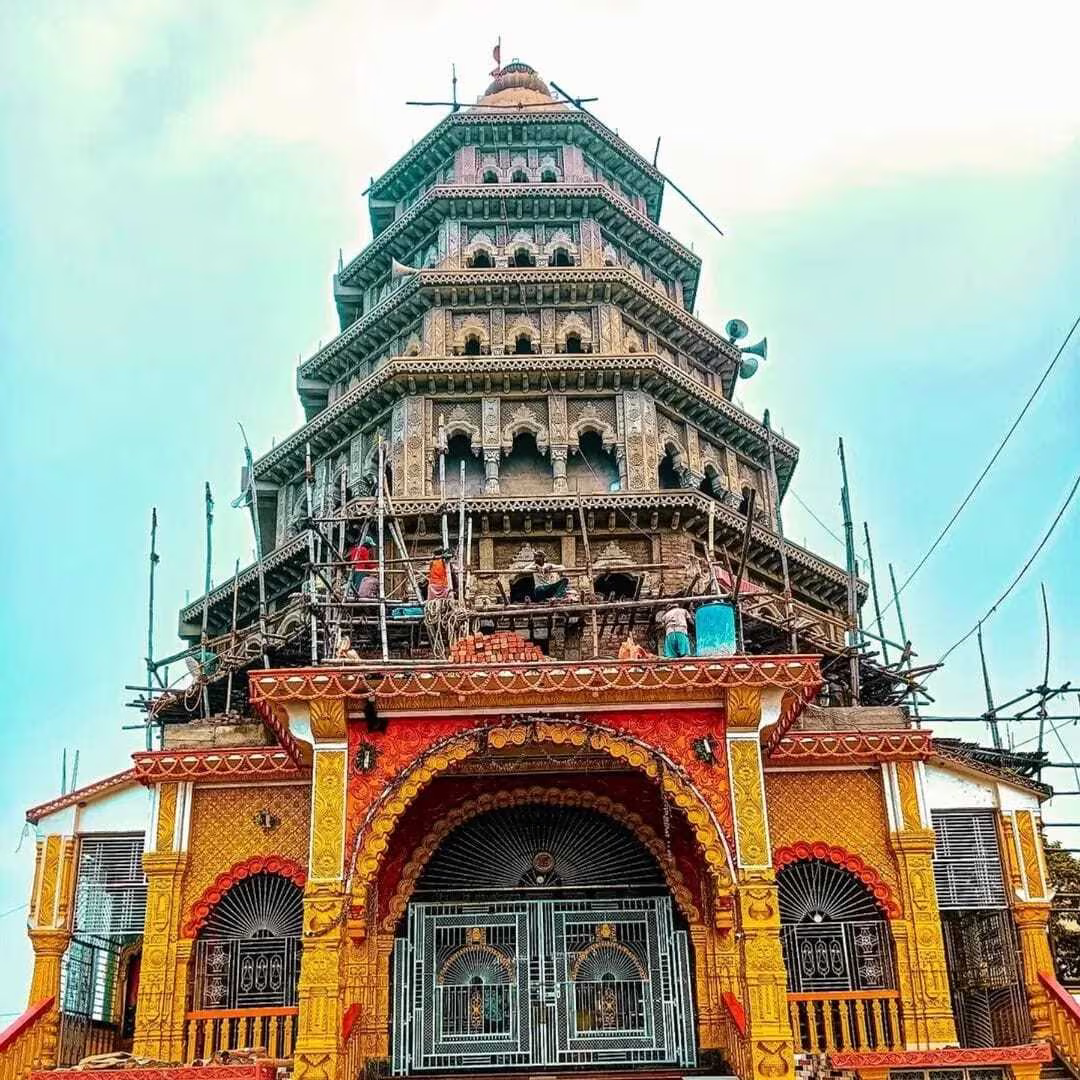

Religion
- Affiliation: Hinduism
- District: Supaul
- Deity: Goddess Durga

Location
- State: Bihar
- Country: India
- Interactive map of Tintoliya Durga Mandir
- Coordinates: 26.293886°N 86.909465°E

Tintoliya Durga Mandir also known as Badi Durga Mandir is an ancient Hindu temple dedicated to goddess Durga located in Chilauni Uttar village of Pratapganj block in Supaul district, Bihar. This temple is revered and serves as a major center of faith and Shakti worship in the Kosi subregion of Mithila.

The temple is located 46 kilometres (29 mi) west-south of the district headquarters, Supaul, and 7 kilometres (4.3 mi) east of Pratapganj.
