= Veena Bharti =

Indian politician

Member of Bihar Legislative Assembly
- In office 2015–2025
- Preceded by: Amla Devi
- Succeeded by: Sonam Rani Sardar
- Constituency: Triveniganj

Personal details
- Party: JD(U)
- Occupation: Politics

Veena Bharti (born 2 February 1970) is an Indian politician from Bihar. She is a Member of the Bihar Legislative Assembly from Triveniganj Assembly constituency which is a reserved constituency for Scheduled Caste community in the Supaul district. She represents Janata Dal (United) and won in the 2020 Bihar Legislative Assembly election.

== Early life and education ==
Bharti is from Triveniganj, Supaul district, Bihar. She is the Wife of late Vishvamohan Bharti. She completed her matriculation in Patna in 1986 and then did her intermediate in 1991.

== Career ==
Bharti won from Triveniganj Assembly constituency representing Janata Dal (United) in the 2020 Bihar Legislative Assembly election. She polled 79,458 votes and defeated her nearest rival, Santosh Kumar of RJD, by a margin of 3,031 votes.
