= Supaul Sadar Subdivision =

Supaul Sadar
- Subdivision
- Interactive map of Supaul Sadar
- Location in Bihar, India Supaul Sadar (India)
- Coordinates: 26°07′15″N 86°36′00″E
- Country: India
- State: Bihar
- Region: Mithila
- Subregion: Kosi
- District: Supaul
- Headquarter: Supaul

Area
  - Total: 1,678 km^{2} (648 sq mi)
- Elevation: 31 m (102 ft)

Population
  - Total: 715,483
  - Density: 426.4/km^{2} (1,104/sq mi)

Language
  - Official: Hindi, [[Maithili
- Time zone: UTC+05:30 (IST)
- Pin: 852131
- Vehicle registration: BR

Supaul Sadar subdivision is an administrative subdivision of Supaul district in the Indian state of Bihar. The subdivision has its headquarters at the city of Supaul and comprises 4 Community Development Blocks: Supaul, Pipra, Kishanganj and bhaptiyahi - Saraigarh (Also called saraygarh).

== Geography ==
Supaul Sadar subdivision lies in the Kosi basin in Kosi subregion. The subdivision forms part of the alluvial plains created by the Kosi river and its distributaries. Official reports describe the area as sandy and flood-prone terrain typical of the Kosi megafan region.

== Administration ==
The subdivision is one of four in Supaul district. It consists of 4 Community Development Blocks:

- Supaul
- Pipra
- Kishanpur
- Saraigarh-Bhaptiyahi

The Sub-Divisional Officer (SDO) for Supaul is based at the Sub Division Office, Supaul (PIN 852131).

== Demographics ==
According to the 2011 Census of India:

- Supaul CD block: population 2,67,263(153,361 males, 141,400 females)
- Kishanpur CD block: population 181,115 (93,668 males, 87,447 females).
- Saraigarh-Bhaptiyahi CD block: population 3,119 (1,615 males, 1,504 females).
- Pipra CD Block: population 50, 993(30, 863 Male, 20, 130 female)

Supaul sadar's total population is 7,15,483.

== Economy ==
Agriculture is the mainstay of the local economy. Paddy and other crops typical of the Kosi floodplain are cultivated. The District Industrial Potential Survey notes the potential for agro-processing and rice mills in the region.

== Transport ==
The subdivision is connected to the whole country and state by national and state highways as well as rural roads. Supaul district has about 133 km of national highways and 229 km of state highways. Railway lines in the district total 85 km.

== Education and public service ==
The Sadar district hospital at Supaul provides healthcare facilities to the subdivision and District. Government schools and residential institutions operate in both blocks under the Bihar Education Department.

== See also ==
- Supaul district
- Treveniganj Subdivision
