= Shibnagar =

Shibnagar may refer to the following places in India:

- Shibnagar, Maldah, a village in West Bengal
- Shibnagar, Bihar, a village in Bihar
- Shibnagar, a locality in Agartala, Tripura
