= Nirmali =

Nirmali Nirmali
- Town
- Nickname: Supaul
- Location in Bihar, India
- Coordinates: 26.32°N 86.58°E
- Country: India
- State: Bihar
- District: Supaul district
- Elevation: 59 m (194 ft)

Population (2011)
  - Total: 20,173

Languages
  - Official: Maithili, Hindi
- Time zone: UTC+5:30 (IST)
- Postal code: 847452
- Vehicle registration: BR-50
- Lok Sabha constituency: Supaul
- Vidhan Sabha constituency: Nirmali

Nirmali is a town and a notified area in Supaul district in the Indian state of Bihar.

== Geography ==
Nirmali is located at 26.32°N 86.58°E. It has an average elevation of 59 metres (193 feet). It has an area of 5.3 km^{2}. It Is surrounded by the Ring Dam, is close to the Kosi and Balaan rivers. On 18 August 2008, the Kosi river picked up an old channel it had abandoned over 100 years previously near the border with Nepal and India. The town was known for its extensive rice production.

== Demographics ==
As of 2011 Nirmali had a population of 20,173. Males constitute 53% of the population and females 47%. Nirmali has an average literacy rate of 59%, lower than the national average of 74.04%: male literacy is 68%, and female literacy is 49%. In Nirmali, 17.6% of the population is under six years of age.

== History ==
Jayaprakash Narayan took refuge in the town after breaking away from Hanuman Nagar Jail (Nepal) during the freedom struggle.

Dr. Rajendra Prasad used the presidential special train to travel from Patna to Nirmali, one of two uses of the train in Indian history.

Nirmali College was established on 10 August 1964.

Nirmali was severely affected by flooding in 1948, 1949, 1954, 1955, 1958, 1987, 2004, and 2008.

Indian Prime Minister Atal Bihari Vajpayee came to the town in 2002 for the laying of the foundation stone of the new Kosi Mahasetu Bridge, replacing a previous bridge which had been washed away by heavy flood and severely damaged in the India-Nepal earthquake in 1934. The new bridge was inaugurated in 2020 by Narendra Modi.

== Transport ==
=== Rail transport ===
Three pairs of train runs between Darbhanga (Laheriasarai) and Saharsa.

=== Bus transport ===
Buses run from Nirmali to other cities in Bihar including Patna, Darbhanga, Bhagalpur, Muzaffarpur, Purnea, Katihar, Forbesganj, Saharsa, and Supaul. Inter State bus routes serve Delhi, Lucknow, Kanpur, Noida, Gurgaon, Ranchi, Siliguri, and Kolkata. Buses also run to Kathmandu, Rajbiraj, and Janakpur in Nepal.

=== Air transport ===
The nearest airports are Rajbiraj Airport 30 km away, and Darbhanga Airport.
