= List of city and town nicknames in India =

This partial list of city nicknames in India compiles the aliases, sobriquets and slogans that cities in India are known by (or have been known by) historically, officially, or unofficially, to locals, outsiders, or their tourism chambers of commerce.

== Andhra Pradesh ==
City/town	Nickname
Guntur	Spice Capital of India
Nuzvid	Mango City
Nellore	Shrimp Capital of India; City of Paddy ( Nelli in Tamil is Grain of Paddy)
Rajamahendravaram	Cultural Capital of Andhra Pradesh
Tenali	Andhra Paris
Tirupati	Spiritual Capital of Andhra Pradesh; Heritage City; City Of Devotion
Vijayawada	The Land of Victory
Visakhapatnam	City of Destiny; The Jewel of the East Coast
Kakinada	City of Peace & Joy; Golden Mantle For All the Coastal Areas; Beauty of Andhra Pradesh

== Bihar ==
City/town	Nickname
Muzaffarpur	The Land of Leechi
Darbhanga	Cultural Capital Of Bihar
Bhagalpur	Silk City of India
Gaya	The City of Enlightenment
Purnia	Mini Darjeeling
Hajipur	Bananas City
Begusarai	Industrial Capital of Bihar
Supaul	Gateway of Kosi Region; Heart of Kosi Region; Garbage Free City in Bihar

== Chhattisgarh ==
City/Town	Nickname
Korba	Silk City of Western Chhattisgarh; Financial Capital of Chhattisgarh; Power Hub of India; Heritage City; Industrial Hub of Chhattisgarh; Coal City of Central India; Aluminium City; Only City with both(Industries and Forest Cover) in India; City with Largest Mine in Asia; Bauxite City; Haematite City

== Gujarat ==
City/Town	Nickname
Ahmedabad (Amdavad, Karnavati, Ashaval)	Coimbatore(TN)/Ahemdabad-Manchester city of India; Commercial Capital of Gujarat; Financial Capital of Western India; Boston of India; Heritage City of Gujarat; Twin City (with Gandhinagar); Night City
Bardoli	Butter City
Gandhinagar	Green City; Capital of Gujarat; Twin City (with Ahmedabad)
Surat	City of Diamonds; Silk City of India; Textile hub of India; city of bridges; Mini Bharat (Small India); cleanest city; city of sun; city of golden opportunities; Future Economic hub of India
Navsari	known as "Paarsipuri" ( CITY OF Parsi'); Twin City of Surat
Rajkot	called as "Chitranagri" (City of Paintings).
Anand	Milk City
Jamnagar	Jewel of Kathiawar; Paris of Saurashtra; Oil city; Mini Kashi; Brass city
Morbi	City of ceramic tiles
Ankleshwar	chemical hub of India (1500 chemical plants); Industrial hub of Gujarat (Asia's largest industrial estate and consists of approximately 3,000 individual units); "City of Oil"
Vadodara (Baroda)	Kala Nagari (City of Arts); Sayaji Nagari (City of Maharaja Sayajirao); Banyan City; Cultural Capital of Gujarat (Sanskari Nagari)

== Jharkhand ==
City/town	Nickname
Jamshedpur	Steel City of India; Pittsburgh of India; Jampot
Dhanbad	Coal Capital of India
Ranchi	City of Waterfalls

== Karnataka ==
City/town	Nickname
Bangalore (Bengaluru)	Silicon Valley of India; Science City of India; Garden City of India; Capital of Karnataka; Electronic Capital of India
Raichur	Cotton Bowl of Karnataka; Rice Bowl of Karnataka; Land of Two Rivers (Edadore Nadu); Land of Sun Light (Bisila Nadu); Land of Power; Land of Dasa's
Hospet	Steel City of Karnataka
Kalaburagi	Land of Toor Dal; Land of Sharana's
Bellary	Land of Mining; Sun City
Indi	Land of Lemons
Bidar	Crown of Karnataka; Land of Bamboo Art
Chitradurga	Fort City (Kote Nadu)
Kodagu	Scotland of India
Mangaluru	• Capital of Tulunad: Rome of The East; Ice Cream Capital of India; Gateway of Karnataka; Cradle of Indian Banking
Mysuru	Sandalwood City; Cultural Capital of Karnataka; City of Palaces
Dharwad	Home of Universities; Education Hub of Karnataka
Yadgir	Land of Hills
Sakleshpura	Poor Man's Ooty
Koppal	Land of Paddy
Kinnal	Land of Wooden Dolls
Shivamogga	GateWay of Malenadu; Land of hidden waterfall and forts
Chikmagalur	Land of Coffee
Tumkur	Land of Coconut Trees
Ramanagara	Silk City of Karnataka
Haveri	Land of Elachi
Ilkal	City of Saree

== Kerala ==
City/town	Nickname
Thiruvananthapuram (Trivandrum)	Evergreen City of India; The Paradise of the South (south referring to southern India); God's Own Capital; Capital of Kerala; City of Peace; Pearl of Arabian Sea; Land of Anatha Padmanabha(Ananthapuri)
Kochi (Cochin)	The Queen of Arabian Sea; Commercial Capital of Kerala; Judicial Capital of Kerala; Gateway to Kerala; Hub of Malayalam Film Industry
Thrissur (Trichur)	The Cultural capital of Kerala; Land of Poorams; The land of Vadakkumnathan; Gold capital of India
Kozhikode (Calicut)	City of Spices
Kannur (Cannanore)	City of Looms and Lores; Manchester of Kerala
Kollam (Quilon)	The Prince of Arabian Sea; Cashew Capital of the World
Alappuzha (Alleppey)	Venice of the East (Note: See List of places called Venice of the East for other places with this nickname.)
Kasaragod	Land of Seven Languages; Harkwillia
Palakkad (Palghat)	Gateway of Kerala; Land of Palm trees; Rice bowl of Kerala
Malappuram	Soccer Capital

== Rajasthan ==
City/town	Nickname
Jaipur	The Pink City; Heritage City; Paris of India; Rajwaro ka Shahar
Udaipur	The White City; City of Lakes; Venice of the East
Jaisalmer	The Golden City; Swarna Nagari
Jodhpur	Blue City; Sun City
Kota	Coaching Capital of India
Ajmer	Heart of Rajasthan

== Tamil Nadu ==
City/town	Nickname
Chennai (Madras)	City Of Many Firsts.; Detroit of Asia; Healthcare Capital of India; Banking Capital of India.; Electronics and Manufacturing Hub of India; City of Flyovers.; Gateway of South India; Capital of Tamil Nadu
Tiruchirappalli / Trichy (Chola Empire)	Rockfort City; Energy equipment and fabrication capital of India; Heart of Tamil Nadu; Capital of Early Chozha Empire
Thanjavur (Chola Empire)	Rice bowl of Tamil Nadu; Capital of Chola Dynasty; Capital of East Asia at 10th Century; Carnatic Music Capital Thiruvaiyaru; Cultural and Historical Hub Of Chola Dynasty – Tamil Nadu
Coimbatore (Kongu,Cheran)	Manchester of South India; Capital of Kongu Nadu; Capital of Chera Nadu; Engineering City of South India; Pump City of India; Motor sport capital of India
Salem (Seralam, Cheralam, Sailam)	Mango City; Geologist Paradise; Mini London of Tamil Nadu; Steel City; Capital of Mazhanadu
Tiruppur	Dollar City of India; Baniyan City; Knit Wear Capital of India
Erode	Turmeric City of India
Puducherry (Pondicherry)	Paris of the East (Note: See Paris of the East for other places with this nickname.); City of Dawn
Thoothukudi	Pearl City of India; Gateway of Tamil Nadu; Salt Capital of Tamil Nadu
Tirunelveli	City of paddy fields; Halwa City; Oxford City of South India
Yercaud	Poor Man's Ooty; Jewel of the South
Ooty	Queen of Hill Stations
Kodaikanal	Princess of Hill stations
Madurai (Vaigai; Pandiya Nadu)	Athens of East; City of Jasmine; City of Festivals; City of Nectar; City of Junction; Temple City; City That Never Sleeps; Cultural Capital of Tamil Nadu; Capital of Pandya Nadu
Kumbakonam	Cambridge of South India

== Telangana ==
City/town	Nickname
Hyderabad	City of Pearls; City of Nizams

== Uttarakhand ==
City/town	Nickname
Dehradun	City of Lakes; School Capital of India
Rishikesh	Adventure Capital of India; Rafting Capital of India; Yoga Capital of the World

== Uttar Pradesh ==
City/town	Nickname
Mathura	Krishnanagari
Gorakhpur	Bulldozer wala; Nya Bihari; Tod for Raja
Lucknow	City of Nawabs; Constantinople of The East
Kanpur	Leather City; Manchester of The East; Heart of Uttar Pradesh
Baghpat	Land of Tigers
Ballia	Baghi Ballia

== West Bengal ==
City/town	Nickname
Calcutta (Kolkata)	City of Joy, Joyful City; Cultural Capital of India; City of Castles; City of Museums; Gateway of Eastern India; London of India
Siliguri	Gateway to the Dooars; Gateway of Northeast India; City of Hospitality
Darjeeling	Queen of the Hills
Malda	Mango City
Midnapore	City of Tribal Tradition, Historical city
Bishnupur	Temple City of Bengal
Durgapur	Ruhr of India
Asansol	City of Brotherhood; Land of Black Diamond
Howrah	Sheffield of India; Glasgow of India
Krishnanagar	Land of Figurines; Village of "Reui"
Nabadwip	Oxford of Bengal

== Maharashtra ==
City/town	Nickname
Bombay (Mumbai)	New York City of India; Mayanagri; The City That Never Sleeps; City of Dreams; City of Seven Islands; Hollywood of India; Gateway of India; Economic & Financial Capital of India
Pune	Cultural capital of Maharashtra; Oxford of the East; The Queen of Deccan
Nagpur	Tiger Capital of India; Heart of India; The Orange City
Navi Mumbai	Flamingo City
Chhatrapati Sambhajinagar	City of Gates
Thane	City of Lakes
Ratnagiri	California of India
Jalna, Maharashtra	city of steel
Yavatmal	Cotton city of India

== See also ==
- Renaming of cities in India
