= Pipra Assembly constituency =

Pipra Assembly constituency may refer to:

- Pipra, Supaul Assembly constituency in Bihar
- Pipra, Purvi Champaran Assembly constituency in Bihar
