= Rambilash Kamat =

Indian politician

Member of Bihar Legislative Assembly
- Incumbent
- Assumed office 2020
- Preceded by: Yaduvansh Kumar
- Constituency: Pipra, Supaul

Personal details
- Party: Janata Dal (United)
- Profession: Politician

Rambilash Kamat (born 20 May 1963) is an Indian politician from Bihar. He is MLA of the Pipra, Supaul Assembly constituency of Supaul district. He won the 2020 Bihar Legislative Assembly election representing the Janata Dal (United). He also won the 2025 Bihar Legislative Assembly election representing the Janata Dal (United).

== Early life and education ==
Kamat is from Supaul, Bihar. His late father, Saryug Kamat, was a farmer. He completed his Bachelor of Arts in 1988 from Bharat Sewak Samaj College, Supaul.

== Career ==
Kamat won from Pipra Assembly constituency representing Janata Dal (United) in the 2020 Bihar Legislative Assembly election. He polled 82,388 votes and defeated his nearest rival, Vishwa Mohan Kumar of Rashtriya Janata Dal, by a margin of 19,245 votes.
