= Vinayak Prasad Yadav =

Indian politician

Member of Parliament, Lok Sabha
- In office 1977-1980
- Preceded by: Chiranjib Jha
- Succeeded by: Kamal Nath Jha
- Constituency: Saharsa, Bihar

Personal details
- Died: 7 January 2002 Kaushalipatti, Bihar
- Party: Janata Party

Vinayak Prasad Yadav (died 7 January 2002) was an Indian politician. He was a Member of Parliament, representing Saharsa, Bihar, in the Lok Sabha, the lower house of India's Parliament, as a member of the Janata Party.

== Life ==
Vinayak Prasad Yadav was jailed several times for his activities as a part of the Quit India Movement in 1942. He was elected a member of the Legislative Assembly of Bihar for the periods 1967-1968 and 1972–1974, as well as being elected in 1985 and 1990. He served for some time as a minister in the Government of Bihar.

Following the killing of Jagdeo Prasad by police at Kurtha in 1974 Yadav, who was then a member of the Samyukta Socialist Party, resigned from the Bihar Legislative Assembly in protest.

Yadav also served one term as a Member of Parliament, being elected to the Sixth Lok Sabha from the Saharsa constituency in Bihar for the period 1977 to 1979. He was among 27 MPs who left the Janata Party parliamentary group in July 1979 in protest at that party's acceptance of associates who were involved with the right-wing Hindutva organisation, the Rashtriya Swayamsevak Sangh. All those among the 27 who came from Bihar were supporters of Karpoori Thakur.

Outside politics, Yadav was a lawyer. He died, aged 74, at Kaushalipatti, Bihar on 7 January 2002.
