= Chiranjib Jha =

Indian politician (born 1915)

Member of Parliament, Lok Sabha
- In office 1971–1977
- Preceded by: Gunanand Thakur
- Succeeded by: Vinayak Prasad Yadav
- Constituency: Saharsa, Bihar

Personal details
- Born: 14 January 1915 Murli, Saharsa district, Bihar, British India
- Party: Indian National Congress

Chiranjib Jha (born 14 January 1915) was an Indian politician. He was a Member of Parliament, representing Saharsa, Bihar in the Lok Sabha the lower house of India's Parliament as a member of the Indian National Congress.
