= Supaul Lok Sabha constituency =

Constituency of the Indian parliament in Bihar

Coordinates: 26.1°N 86.6°E

Supaul
- Lok Sabha constituency

Constituency details
- Country: India
- Region: East India
- State: Bihar
- Established: 2009
- Reservation: None

Member of Parliament
- 18th Lok Sabha
- Incumbent Dileshwar Kamait
- Party: JD(U)
- Alliance: NDA
- Elected year: 2024

Supaul is one of the 40 Lok Sabha (parliamentary) constituencies in Bihar state in eastern India. This constituency came into existence in 2008 as a part of the implementation of delimitation of parliamentary constituencies based on the recommendations of the Delimitation Commission of India.

Most successful parties from Supaul Lok Sabha
1. JDU (3 times) (75.0%)
2. INC (1 time) (25.0%)

== Assembly segments ==
Presently, Supaul Lok Sabha constituency comprises the following six Vidhan Sabha (legislative assembly) segments:

#	Name	District	Member	Party	2024 lead
41	Nirmali	Supaul	Aniruddha Prasad Yadav	JD(U)	JD(U)
42	Pipra	Supaul	Rambilash Kamat	JD(U)	JD(U)
43	Supaul	Supaul	Bijendra Prasad Yadav	JD(U)	JD(U)
44	Triveniganj (SC)	Supaul	Sonam Rani Sardar	JD(U)	JD(U)
45	Chhatapur	Supaul	Neeraj Kumar Singh	BJP	JD(U)
72	Singheshwar (SC)	Madhepura	Ramesh Rishidev	JD(U)	JD(U)

== Members of Parliament ==
Year	Name	Party
1952-2009 : See Saharsa Lok Sabha constituency
2009	Vishwa Mohan Kumar	Janata Dal (United)
2014	Ranjeet Ranjan	Indian National Congress
2019	Dileshwar Kamait	Janata Dal (United)
2024	Dileshwar Kamait	Janata Dal (United)

== Election results ==
=== 2024 ===
2024 Indian general election: Supaul
Party	Candidate	Votes	%	±%
JD(U)	Dileshwar Kamait	595,038	48.33	▼5.45
RJD	Chandrahas Chaupal	4,25,235	34.54	N/A
Independent	Baidya Nath Mehta	51,652	4.20	N/A
Majority		1,69,803	13.79	▼10.23
Turnout		12,31,554	63.85	▼1.87
JD(U) hold		Swing		

=== 2019 ===
2019 Indian general elections: Supaul
Party	Candidate	Votes	%	±%
JD(U)	Dileshwar Kamait	597,377	53.78	+25.63
INC	Ranjeet Ranjan	3,30,524	29.76	−4.54
Independent	Vishwa Mohan Kumar	23,045	2.07	
Independent	Rajesh Kumar	20,320	1.83	
Independent	Binod Kumar Sahu	19,277	1.74	
Majority		2,66,853	24.02	+17.87
Turnout		11,10,966	65.72	
JD(U) gain from INC		Swing		

=== 2014 ===
2014 Indian general elections: Supaul
Party	Candidate	Votes	%	±%
INC	Ranjeet Ranjan	3,78,927	40.30	+13.14
JD(U)	Dileshwar Kamait	2,73,255	28.15	−16.81
BJP	Kameshwar Chaupal	2,49,693	25.73	+25.73
NOTA	None of the Above	21,996	2.27	+2.27
BSP	Aman Kumar Samajsevi	21,233	2.19	+0.16
JHP	Suresh Kumar Azad	14,754	1.52	+1.52
CPI(ML)L	Jay Narayan Yadav	11,566	1.19	+1.19
Majority		1,05,672	12.15	
Turnout		9,70,544	63.62	
INC gain from JD(U)		Swing		

== See also ==
- Supaul district
- List of constituencies of the Lok Sabha
