= Supaul Assembly constituency =

Coordinates: 26°06′30″N 86°36′04″E

Supaul
- Constituency No. 43 for the Bihar Legislative Assembly

Constituency details
- Country: India
- Region: East India
- State: Bihar
- District: Supaul
- Established: 1951
- Total electors: 293,575

Member of Legislative Assembly
- 18th Bihar Legislative Assembly
- Incumbent Bijendra Prasad Yadav; Deputy Chief Minister of Bihar
- Party: JD(U)
- Alliance: NDA
- Elected year: 2025

Supaul Assembly constituency is an assembly constituency in Supaul district in the Indian state of Bihar. In 2015 Bihar Legislative Assembly election, Supaul will be one of the 36 seats to have VVPAT enabled electronic voting machines.

== Overview ==
As per Delimitation of Parliamentary and Assembly constituencies Order, 2008, No. 43 Supaul Assembly constituency is composed of the following: Supaul municipality; Gopalpur Sire, Bakaur, Ghuran, Baruari, Pipra Khurd, Ramdatt Patti, Balwa, Karnpur, Laukha, Basbitti, Goth Baruari, Ekma, Balha, Bairo, Sukhpur Solhni, Telwa, Bairiya, Chainsinghpatti, Malhni, Parsarma Parsauni gram panchayats of Supaul community development block; and Marauna CD Block.

Supaul Assembly constituency is part of No. 8 Supaul (Lok Sabha constituency).

== Members of the Legislative Assembly ==
Year	Name	Party
1952	Lahtan Choudhary	Indian National Congress
1957	Parmeshwar Kumar	Praja Socialist Party
1958^	Lahtan Choudhary	Indian National Congress
1962	Parmeshwar Kumar	Praja Socialist Party
1967	Uma Shanker Singh	Indian National Congress
1969	Uma Shanker Singh	Indian National Congress
1972	Uma Shanker Singh	Indian National Congress
1977	Amarendra Prasad Singh	Janata Party
1980	Uma Shankar Singh	Indian National Congress (I)
1985	Pramod Kumar Singh	Indian National Congress
1990	Bijendra Prasad Yadav	Janata Dal
1995	Bijendra Prasad Yadav	Janata Dal
2000	Bijendra Prasad Yadav	Janata Dal (United)
2005	Bijendra Prasad Yadav	Janata Dal (United)
2005	Bijendra Prasad Yadav	Janata Dal (United)
2010	Bijendra Prasad Yadav	Janata Dal (United)
2015	Bijendra Prasad Yadav	Janata Dal (United)
2020	Bijendra Prasad Yadav	Janata Dal (United)
2025	Bijendra Prasad Yadav	Janata Dal (United)

== Election results ==
=== 2025 ===
2025 Bihar Legislative Assembly election: Supaul
Party	Candidate	Votes	%	±%
JD(U)	Bijendra Prasad Yadav	109,085	52.16	▲1.96
INC	Minnatullah Rahmani	78,282	37.43	▲3.6
JSP	Anil Kumar Singh	5,139	2.46	
Independent	Shambhu Babu	2,873	1.37	
Jagrook Janta Party	Satyanarayan Sharma	2,321	1.11	
AAP	Braj Bhushan Navin	1,975	0.94	
NOTA	None of the above	5,221	2.5	▲0.06
Majority		30,803	14.73	▼1.64
Turnout		209,147	71.24	▲11.79
JD(U) hold		Swing		

=== 2020 ===
2020 Bihar Legislative Assembly election: Supaul
Party	Candidate	Votes	%	±%
JD(U)	Bijendra Prasad Yadav	86,174	50.2	▼4.49
INC	Minnatullah Rahmani	58,075	33.83	
LJP	Prabhash Chandra Mandal	8,515	4.96	
Independent	Anil Kumar Singh	5,736	3.34	
Jai Hind Party	Suresh Kumar Azad	2,616	1.52	▼2.14
NOTA	None of the above	4,180	2.44	▼0.42
Majority		28,099	16.37	▼8.48
Turnout		171,648	59.45	▲2.41
JD(U) hold		Swing		

=== 2015 ===
2015 Bihar Legislative Assembly election: Supaul
Party	Candidate	Votes	%	±%
JD(U)	Bijendra Prasad Yadav	82,295	54.69	
BJP	Kishor Kumar	44,898	29.84	
Jai Hind Party	Suresh Kumar Azad	5,501	3.66	
BSP	Md. Ziyaur Rahman	4,322	2.87	
Independent	Bijendra Narayan Yadav	2,907	1.93	
RJP	Bhogi Mandal	1,917	1.27	
CPI(ML)L	Arvind Kumar Sharma	1,915	1.27	
NOTA	None of the above	4,309	2.86	
Majority		37,397	24.85	
Turnout		150,466	57.04	
