= Bhabhua subdivision =

Administrative subdivision in Kaimur district, Bihar, India

Bhabhua subdivision Bhabua subdivision
- Subdivision
- Location in Bihar, India Bhabhua subdivision (India)
- Coordinates: 25.0488169°N 83.6146779°E
- Country: India
- State: Bihar
- District: Kaimur
- Headquarter: Bhabhua

Area
  - Total: 326 km^{2} (126 sq mi)

Population (2011)
  - Total: 301,440
  - Density: 925/km^{2} (2,390/sq mi)

Languages
  - Official: Hindi (official); Bhojpuri (regional)
- Time zone: UTC+5:30 (IST)
- PIN: 821101
- Vehicle registration: BR-45

Bhabhua subdivision (also spelled Bhabua) is an administrative subdivision of Kaimur district in the Indian state of Bihar. The subdivision's headquarters is the town of Bhabhua. It comprises six rural Community Development (CD) blocks and one statutory town (Bhabua Nagar Parishad).

== Geography ==
Bhabhua subdivision lies in the western-southwestern part of Kaimur district on the fringe of the Kaimur Plateau. The subdivision is located at approximately 25.0488169°N 83.6146779°E. Major drainage in the subdivision is provided by tributaries of the Durgavati–Suar system; small local streams and seasonal rivulets drain the plateau and adjoining alluvial tracts. Much of the subdivision consists of undulating plateau and low hills (Kaimur Range) to the south and slightly more even alluvial plains toward the north. Parts of the subdivision are reported to be flood-prone in low-lying areas adjacent to river channels during the monsoon. Groundwater resources and local hydrogeology for the Bhabua area are documented by the Central Ground Water Board (CGWB).

== Administration ==
Bhabhua subdivision is one of two sub-divisions in Kaimur district (the other being Mohania) and comprises the following Community Development Blocks:

- Adhaura
- Bhabhua (which contains the Bhabua Nagar Parishad)
- Bhagwanpur
- Chainpur
- Chand
- Rampur

These blocks and the subdivision are administered by block development offices and the Sub-Divisional Officer (SDO) at Bhabua.

== Demographics ==
According to the 2011 Census, the Bhabhua subdivision (the six CD blocks listed above together with Bhabua town) recorded a total population of 301,440, with the statutory town of Bhabua (Nagar Parishad) accounting for 50,179 persons. Literacy, sex ratio, and Scheduled Caste / Scheduled Tribe totals are recorded in the District Census Handbook for the constituent blocks and towns.

- Population (2011) — 301,440
- Urban population (Bhabua Nagar Parishad, 2011) — 50,179
- Languages — Hindi (official); Bhojpuri widely spoken locally

== Economy ==
The economy of the subdivision is primarily agrarian, with most of the rural workforce engaged in cultivation and agricultural labour. Small-scale stone quarrying, brick kilns, and related activities are present in parts of the subdivision. Block-wise data on main and marginal workers, cultivators, and agricultural labourers are detailed in the District Census Handbook.

== Transport ==
Bhabhua subdivision is connected by road and rail links serving the district headquarters and the blocks. National and State highways traverse Kaimur district; local roads link block headquarters and market towns. Rail connectivity is available through Bhabua Road and nearby stations, and bus services connect the subdivision to neighbouring districts.

== Education and public services ==
Education and public services are documented in the District Census Handbook and district portal. The subdivision contains primary, middle, and secondary schools, with higher-secondary and collegiate facilities concentrated in Bhabua town. Health infrastructure includes a Sadar Hospital at Bhabhua, Primary Health Centres (PHCs), and Community Health Centres (CHCs). Water supply, sanitation, post offices, and electrification data are reported at the village level.

== See also ==
- Kaimur district
- Bhabhua
- Bhagwanpur
- Chainpur
- Chand
- Rampur
