= Shibnagar, Bihar =

Village in Bihar, India

Shibnagar
- Village
- Location within Bihar Location within India
- Coordinates: 26°24′06″N 86°57′00″E
- Country: India
- State: Bihar
- District: Supaul
- Block: Basantpur

Government
  - Type: Sarpanch

Area
  - Total: 2.28 km^{2} (0.88 sq mi)
- Elevation: 75 m (246 ft)

Population (2011)
  - Total: 2,099
  - Density: 921/km^{2} (2,380/sq mi)

Languages
  - Local: Maithili, Hindi
- Time zone: UTC+5:30 (IST)
- PIN: 854340
- STD code: 06473
- Vehicle registration: BR-50

Shibnagar is a village in Supaul district, Bihar, India. It is located near the Indo-Nepalese border, 46 kilometres northeast of the district capital Supaul. As of 2011, Shibnagar's reported population was 2,099.

== Geography ==
Shibnagar is situated to the east of the Kosi river. The village covers an area of 228 hectares.

== Demographics ==
At the 2011 census, the population of Shibnagar was 2,099, among whom 1,117 were male and 982 were female. Working population accounted for 32.78% of the overall population. Literacy rate of the village stood at 50.98%, with 697 of the male inhabitants and 373 of the female inhabitants being literate.
