= Gauripur supaul =

- tola
- Country: India
- State: Bihar
- District: Supaul

Languages
  - Official: Maithili, Hindi
- Time zone: UTC+5:30 (IST)
- PIN: 852130
- Telephone code: 06473
- ISO 3166 code: IN-BR
- Vehicle registration: BR-20
- Coastline: 0 kilometres (0 mi)
- Lok Sabha constituency: Supaul

Gauripur is a tola (locality) in village of Sukhpur Supaul district of state Bihar, India.
