= Ranjeet Ranjan =

Indian politician

Member of Parliament, Rajya Sabha
- Incumbent
- Assumed office 29 June 2022
- Preceded by: Ramvichar Netam
- Constituency: Chhattisgarh

Member of Parliament, Lok Sabha
- In office 16 May 2014 – 23 May 2019
- Preceded by: Dinesh Chandra Yadav
- Succeeded by: Dileshwar Kamait
- Constituency: Supaul
- In office 16 May 2004 – 16 May 2009
- Preceded by: Dinesh Chandra Yadav
- Constituency: Saharsa

Personal details
- Born: 7 January 1974 (age 52) Rewa, Madhya Pradesh, India
- Party: Indian National Congress
- Spouse: Pappu Yadav (Rajesh Ranjan)

Ranjeet Ranjan (born 7 January 1974) also known as Ranjeeta is an Indian politician serving as Member of Parliament, Rajya Sabha from Chhattisgarh. She was member of the 14th Lok Sabha as a Member of Parliament from Supaul, Bihar from the Indian National Congress party.

She is married to politician Rajesh Ranjan better known as Pappu Yadav a four-time winner of the Lok Sabha polls, who has also won the 16th Lok Sabha election from the constituency of Madhepura, Bihar as an independent Rashtriya Janata Dal candidate.

In the 14th Lok Sabha, she won and became one of the youngest MPs of Saharsa in North Bihar, Even though Congress' star campaigners, Sonia Gandhi and Rahul Gandhi, have not canvassed her in Supaul, she still managed to attract 332927 votes on her own and winning the elections against her immediate rivals Dileshwar Kamait of JD(U) and Kameshwar Chaupal of BJP.

== Life ==
Ranjan was born in Rewa, Madhya Pradesh brought up in Jammu, studied in Punjab and settled in Delhi. Further, her ancestors were Kashmiri Pandit turned Sikhs.

Rajesh Ranjan converted to Sikhism and married her.

One year after the marriage, she contested the assembly elections in 1995, but lost. After this she was involved in Pappu Yadav's election campaign in 1999. In 2004, she entered the fray again, from Saharsa in North Bihar, near Pappu's stronghold of Purnea.

However, in 2009, she shifted to the nearby Supaul constituency, partly because both she and her husband changed over to the Indian National Congress. This time though, she lost by more than 1.5 lakhs to Vishwa Mohan Kumar of Janata Dal (United).

In the 2014 elections Ranjeeta Ranjan gained the Supaul seat as a Congress candidate defeating JD(U) rival Dileshwar Kamait by around 60,000 votes and made it to Lok Sabha.

On Women's day 2016, she came to parliament on her Harley Davidson bike.
