= Banainia =

Banainia is an ancient village located in the Saraigarh Bhaptiyahi C.D. block of Supaul district in Bihar, India.. It is now in koshi river .
