= Bhagwanpur, Kaimur =

Bhagwanpur Bhagwānpur
- Village
- Location in Bihar, India Bhagwanpur (India)
- Coordinates: 24.95883°N 83.60592°E
- Country: India
- State: Bihar
- District: Kaimur

Area
  - Total: 0.98 km^{2} (0.38 sq mi)
- Elevation: 100 m (330 ft)

Population (2011)
  - Total: 6,213
  - Density: 6,300/km^{2} (16,000/sq mi)

Languages
  - Official: Bhojpuri, Hindi
- Time zone: UTC+5:30 (IST)

Bhagwanpur is a village and corresponding community development block in Kaimur district of Bihar, India. As of 2011, its population was 6,213, in 1,081 households, while the total block population was 91,113, in 15,145 households.

The famous Mundeshwari Temple is located in Ramgarh village of Bhagwanpur block.

== Geography ==
Bhagwanpur is a hilly block with no canal systems; irrigation is done instead with ditches and ponds.

== Demographics ==
The 2011 census of India reported that Bhagwanpur block had a sex ratio of 923 females to every 1000 males (about the same as the district ratio of 920). The sex ratio was higher in the 0-6 age group, with 971 females for every 1000 males; the sex ratio in this group was the highest in Kaimur district. Of the block's total population of 91,113, a total of 16,968 people were ages 0–6. Members of scheduled castes made up 27.26% of the block population, and members of scheduled tribes made up 2.52%. The literacy rate in Bhagwanpur block was 65.10% (74.40% among men and 54.91% among women), which was a bit lower than the district average of 69.34%.

Most of the block's workforce was employed in agriculture in 2011, with 27.27% of workers being cultivators who owned or leased their own land and another 50.23% being agricultural labourers who worked someone else's land for wages. An additional 7.03% of workers were counted as household industry workers, and the remaining 15.46% were other workers. The majority of Bhagwanpur block's workforce was male, with 21,208 being men and 7,661 being women.

== Villages ==
Bhagwanpur block contains the following 135 villages:

Village name	Total land area (hectares)	Population (in 2011)
Shivpur Padmadehri	70	491
Ora	164	1,209
Katkara	110	795
Sundri	19	0
Kunrwa	41	291
Chakedehra	99	351
Ghosa	91	861
Kasturi Sarai	16	59
Sisaundha	51	0
Lahra	42	212
Dubauli	94	849
Khaira	50	205
Singhi	84	481
Chorghatia	49	336
Matar	157	803
Nawadih	30	0
Umapur	231	2,144
Dhangarha	186	284
Tori	882	6,404
Marari	38	188
Pathraur	13	0
Desarna	117	358
Kishunapur	25	384
Haripur	67	0
Athbanhi	65	0
Semra	51	0
Radha Khanr	48	992
Basantpur	82	844
Reghiya	30	137
Nadula	23	655
Urgawan	90	1,617
Bhataulia	32	500
Nimian	22	387
Tendua	53	346
Kathaura Khamari	35	304
Dullahpur	30	607
Bhaupur	18	0
Jaitpurpai	34	0
Jaitpur Kohna	34	806
Jaitpur Khurd	49	33
Sabai Kundi	43	401
Arari	48	528
Debra	31	351
Chaukhara	14	0
Nawagawan	74	64
Darra	23	13
Bahuri	47	434
Parari	74	459
Tekra	81	807
Babura	79	0
Dhekahri	63	372
Urgain	54	905
Pihra	81	1,140
Mirchi	66	677
Dhurekhar	70	0
Kaser	123	3,836
Dhekahri	26	45
Jalaibar	31	550
Mahran	17	0
Rajpur	82	775
Bhaluhi	38	9
Urgain	94	673
Mehandwar	117	575
Sangrampur	25	0
Gobrachh	93	1,340
Parhauti	207	2,214
Parmalpur	51	1,821
Manikpur	72	745
Khiri	117	1,106
Nokhilla	39	0
Bhagwanpur (block headquarters)	98	6,213
Keshriganj	69	73
Bhaisahi	52	245
Masahi	285	1,565
Papahra	254	0
Saraiya	205	2,720
Gaura	30	413
Chholhat Sajanwa	51	136
Paharia	217	2,702
Shahpur	59	1,650
Balbhaddarpur	75	0
Kurna	20	0
Nibi	47	333
Diha Khurd	32	0
Diha Kalan	116	183
Ausan	113	1,512
Bhairapur	89	906
Akorhi	76	133
Walipur	52	334
Henauta	50	193
Dadra	122	925
Bahoranpur	76	122
Kochra	55	0
Kochari	86	1,686
Kusdehra	94	629
Sareyan	61	57
Mokaram Purab Patti	428	1,878
Mokaram Pachhim Patti	160	644
Jasuanwan	26	0
Sariawan	30	57
Patriha	85	579
Jagdishpur	21	148
Majhiyawan	51	441
Sonadih	90	0
Dawanpur	59	569
Baulia	17	0
Nawanagar	81	408
Beldih	40	341
Bakharhandh	19	522
Kuwan Pokhar	26	0
Harjipur	53	0
Kinarchola	32	1,040
Jaitpur Kalan	102	2,149
Kunrwa	44.8	15
Netpur	234	102
Ramawatpur	280	918
Khardiha	82	952
Bucha	97	854
Amarpur	539	517
Dharchali	96	606
Damarpur	42	197
Naugarh Pachhim Patti	50	1,142
Naugarh Purab Patti	106	860
Dumri	108	0
Samda	57	0
Makrikhoh	5,979	1,044
Ramgarh	202.7	4,877
Kunrwa	27.9	466
Rajbandhwa	42.1	16
Jharia	297.8	0
Paunra	693.6	32
Bajardihwa	495.3	885
Parari	564	1,084
Chuan	2,312	1,150
Bhurkura	2,524	117
