= Lahtan Choudhary =

Indian politician

Member of Parliament, Lok Sabha
- In office 1964-1967
- Preceded by: Bhupendra Narayan Mandal
- Succeeded by: Gunanand Thakur
- Constituency: Saharsa, Bihar

Personal details
- Party: Indian National Congress

Lahtan Choudhary was an Indian politician. He was a Member of Parliament, representing Saharsa, Bihar in the Lok Sabha the lower house of India's Parliament as a member of the Indian National Congress.
