= Kunauli =

- town
- Location in Bihar, India
- Coordinates: 26°26′56″N 86°46′27″E
- Country: India
- State: Bihar
- District: Supaul
- Elevation: 73 m (240 ft)
- Time zone: UTC+5:30 (IST)
- PIN: 847451

Kunauli is a town located in the Supaul (old Saharsa) district of Bihar, India on the border of Nepal's Saptari District.

== Koshi and Kunauli ==
The Western Embankment Bank of Koshi runs through Kunauli. During the floods in 1948, 1949, 1954, 1955, 1958 etc., it has severely affected the convex bends of western bank at several places like Kunauli Bazar.

The flood generally does great damage to the road leading to the Kunauli town and wash out its 3 kilometers portion. The water of the Koshi river pours out from the breach that develops in its western embankment and submerge a large portion of it.

It is the panchayat of many villages like Kamalpur and the villages surrounding it near the Kosi region.
