= Saharsa Lok Sabha constituency =

Former constituency of the Indian parliament in Bihar

Coordinates: 25.9°N 86.6°E

Saharsa
- Former Lok Sabha constituency

Constituency details
- Country: India
- Region: East India
- State: Bihar
- Established: 1952
- Abolished: 2008

Saharsa was a Lok Sabha constituency in Bihar, India.

== Members of Parliament ==
Year	Name	Party
1952	Lalit Narayan Mishra	Indian National Congress
1957	Lalit Narayan Mishra	Indian National Congress
1962	Bhupendra Narayan Mandal	Praja Socialist Party
1964^	Lahtan Choudhary	Indian National Congress
1967	Gunanand Thakur	Samyukta Socialist Party
1971	Chiranjib Jha	Indian National Congress
1977	Vinayak Prasad Yadav	Janata Party
1980	Kamal Nath Jha	Indian National Congress
1984	Chandra Kishore Pathak	Indian National Congress
1989	Sury Narayan Yadav	Janata Dal
1991	Sury Narayan Yadav	Janata Dal
1996	Dinesh Chandra Yadav	Janata Dal
1998	Anup Lal Yadav	Rashtriya Janata Dal
1999	Dinesh Chandra Yadav	Janata Dal (United)
2004	Ranjeet Ranjan	Lok Janshakti Party

^ by poll

- 2008 onwards: see Supaul Lok Sabha constituency

== Detailed Results ==
Vote share of Winning candidates
2004	47.47%
1999	54.45%
1998	35.76%
1996	57.12%
1991	57.81%
1989	66.12%
1984	43.69%
1980	39.73%
1977	67.35%
1971	48.72%
1967	39.86%
1964 (by-poll)	47.89%
1962	49.22%
1957	23.70%
1957	20.98%
1952	64.54%

=== 2004 ===
2004 Indian general election: Saharsa
Party	Candidate	Votes	%	±%
LJP	Ranjeet Ranjan	350,426	47.47	
JD(U)	Dinesh Chandra Yadav	319,639	43.30	
IND	Suresh Kumar Azad	15,415	2.09	
SP	Shiv Shankar Thakur	12,770	1.73	
IND	Devendra Mukhia	8,964	1.21	
BSP	Suresh Prasad Mehta	8,950	1.21	
AD	Mohan Kamat	7,301	0.99	
IND	Ramdeo Sharma	7,283	0.99	
JHP (Note: Jai Hind Party)	Mohd. Kamal Uddin	4,220	0.57	
SS	Deonarayan Das	3,312	0.45	
Majority		30,787	4.17	
Turnout				
Swing to LJP from JD(U)		Swing		

=== 1999 ===
1999 Indian general election: Saharsa
Party	Candidate	Votes	%	±%
JD(U)	Dinesh Chandra Yadav	392,926	54.45	
RJD	Surya Narayan Yadav	298,433	41.36	
BHJC (Note: Bharatiya Jan Congress)	Niraj Kumar	12,969	1.80	
AJBP (Note: Ajeya Bharat Party)	Dinesh Prasad Sinha	11,479	1.59	
IND	Lalan Choudhary	5,790	0.80	
Majority		94,493	13.09	
Turnout		732,053	64.10	
Swing to JD(U) from RJD		Swing		

=== 1998 ===
1998 Indian general election: Saharsa
Party	Candidate	Votes	%	±%
RJD	Anuplal Yadav	259,961	35.76	
JD	Dinesh Chandra Yadav	205,793	28.31	
SAP	Ch. Md. Farooque Salahuddin	192,749	26.51	
INC	Taranand Sada	52,579	7.23	
BLLP (Note: Bharti Lok Lehar Party)	Ganganath Roy	9,959	1.37	
IND	Jawahar Rajak	6,009	0.83	
Majority		54,168	7.45	
Turnout		738,969	64.73	
Swing to RJD from JD		Swing		

=== 1996 ===
1996 Indian general election: Saharsa
Party	Candidate	Votes	%	±%
JD	Dinesh Chandera Yadav	399,804	57.12	
INC	Surya Narian Yadav	247,359	35.34	
IND	Noor Ahmed	28,507	4.07	
AIIC(T)	Chiranjiv Jha	2,888	0.41	
IND	14 Independent Candidates	21,439	3.06	
Majority		152,445	21.78	
Turnout		709,379	62.72	
JD hold		Swing		

=== 1991 ===
1991 Indian general election: Saharsa
Party	Candidate	Votes	%	±%
JD	Surya Narain Yadav	440,749	57.81	
INC	Taranand Sada	242,641	31.83	
JP	Vaidyanath Mehta	36,113	4.74	
BJP	Mirtunjay Nr. Mishra	24,391	3.20	
IND	17 Independent Candidates	16,623	2.17	
OTH	2 Other Party Candidates	1,879	0.24	
Majority		198,108	25.98	
Turnout		772,419	72.73	
JD hold		Swing		

=== 1989 ===
1989 Indian general election: Saharsa
Party	Candidate	Votes	%	±%
JD	Surya Nr. Yadav	502,662	66.12	
INC	Chandra Kishore Pathak	225,581	29.67	
BJP	Vijay Kumar Misra	17,312	2.28	
DDP	Vabhunand Prasad	3,461	0.46	
IND	8 Independent Candidates	11,257	1.47	
Majority		277,081	36.45	
Turnout		770,308	72.77	
Swing to JD from INC		Swing		

=== 1984 ===
1984 Indian general election: Saharsa
Party	Candidate	Votes	%	±%
INC	Chandra Kishore Pathak	273,793	43.69	
LKD	Vinayak Prasad Yadav	165,709	26.44	
JP	Anand Mohan Singh	130,724	20.86	
IND	Nageshwar Prasad Yadav	40,349	6.44	
IND	Thako Sada	5,559	0.89	
IND	Nagesar Yadav	4,818	0.77	
IND	Murlidhar Das	2,727	0.44	
IND	Vaidyanath Mehta	2,011	0.32	
IND	Sadashiv Chaudhary	1,012	0.16	
Majority		108,084	17.25	
Turnout		638,061	69.87	
INC hold		Swing		

=== 1980 ===
1980 Indian general election: Saharsa
Party	Candidate	Votes	%	±%
INC(I)	Kamal Nath Jha	195,337	39.73	
JP(S)	Vinayak Pd. Yadav	194,082	39.47	
JP	Mohammad Hayat Ali	70,690	14.38	
IND	Raj Kumar Sharma	12,842	2.61	
IND	Chandeshwar Sah	6,407	1.30	
IND	Thako Sada	4,141	0.84	
IND	Musahru Choudhary	3,822	0.78	
IND	Panchanan Yadav	2,316	0.47	
IND	Ram Prabodh Rai	2,077	0.42	
Majority		1,255	0.26	
Turnout		499,103	62.09	
Swing to INC(I) from JP		Swing		

=== 1977 ===
1977 Indian general election: Saharsa
Party	Candidate	Votes	%	±%
JP	Vinayak Prasad Yadav	306,994	67.35	
INC	Chiranjib Jha	118,288	25.95	
IND	Nageshwar Khan	12,847	2.82	
IND	Kali Kant Jha	12,054	2.64	
IND	Baidya Nath Kamat	3,504	0.77	
IND	Madan Chaudhary	2,112	0.46	
Majority		188,706	41.40	
Turnout		464,082	68.08	
Swing to JP from INC		Swing		

=== 1971 ===
1971 Indian general election: Saharsa
Party	Candidate	Votes	%	±%
INC	Chiranjib Jha	156,166	48.72	
SSP	Gunanand Thakur	79,828	24.90	
INC(O)	Mahabir Pd. Yadav	56,060	17.49	
IND	Kapileshwar Pd. Yadav	17,539	5.47	
IND	Ali Hussain	9,067	2.83	
IND	Jiyalal Mandal	1,903	0.59	
Majority		76,338	23.82	
Turnout		326,632	54.24	
Swing to INC from SSP		Swing		

=== 1967 ===
1967 Indian general election: Saharsa
Party	Candidate	Votes	%	±%
SSP	G. Thakur	124,018	39.86	
INC	L. Choudhury	119,399	38.38	
ABJS	M. P. Singh	37,213	11.96	
PSP	S. Ullah	25,794	8.29	
SWA	K. K. Jha	4,700	1.51	
Majority		4,619	1.48	
Turnout		323,072	60.33	
Swing to SSP from INC		Swing		

=== 1964 by-election ===
1964 Indian by-election: Saharsa
Party	Candidate	Votes	%	±%
INC	L. Chaudhry	101,269	47.89	
SSP	B. N. Mandal	99,434	47.02	
ABJS	C. Jha	10,552	4.99	
Majority		1,835	0.87	
Turnout				
Swing to INC from Socialist		Swing		

=== 1962 ===
1962 Indian general election: Saharsa
Party	Candidate	Votes	%	±%
Socialist	Bhupendra Narayan Mandal	97,038	49.22	
INC	Lalit Narayan Mishra	81,905	41.54	
SWA	Ram Anugrah Jha	18,218	9.24	
Majority		15,133	7.68	
Turnout		206,752	48.44	
Swing to Socialist from INC		Swing		

=== 1957 ===
1957 Indian general election: Saharsa (2 seats)
Party	Candidate	Votes	%	±%
INC	Lalit Narain Mishra	144,773	23.70	
INC	Bholi Sardar	128,207	20.98	
IND	Jaikumar Singh	75,110	12.29	
CPI	Sachidanand Mandal	52,353	8.57	
CPI	Neti Lal	51,957	8.50	
IND	Kirai Mushar	51,811	8.48	
PSP	Etwari Sada	44,367	7.26	
PSP	Shiv Chandra Jha	42,309	6.92	
IND	Bajdyanath Kamat	20,074	3.29	
Turnout		610,961	42.75	

=== 1952 ===
1952 Indian general election: Darbhanga cum Bhagalpur
Party	Candidate	Votes	%	±%
INC	Lalit Narayan Misra	94,414	64.54	
Socialist	Tapeshwari Mandal	51,877	35.46	
Majority		42,537	29.08	
Turnout		146,291	44.13	
INC win (new seat)				

== See also ==
- Saharsa
- List of constituencies of the Lok Sabha
