= Triveniganj subdivision =

Administrative subdivision in Supaul district, Bihar, India

- Subdivision
- Location in Bihar, India Triveniganj subdivision (India)
- Coordinates: 26.1305993°N 86.8830260°E
- Country: India
- State: Bihar
- District: Supaul district
- Headquarters: Triveniganj

Population (2011)
  - Total: 608,933
- Combined total of Triveniganj and Chhatapur Community Development Blocks (2011 Census)

Languages
  - Official: Hindi, Maithili
- Time zone: UTC+05:30 (IST)
- PIN: 852139
- Vehicle registration: BR

Triveniganj subdivision is an administrative subdivision of Supaul district in the Indian state of Bihar. The subdivision has its headquarters at the town of Triveniganj and comprises two Community Development Blocks: Triveniganj (also called Tribeniganj) and Chhatapur.

== Geography ==
Triveniganj subdivision lies in the lower Kosi basin in north-eastern Bihar. The subdivision forms part of the alluvial plains created by the Kosi river and its distributaries. Official reports describe the area as sandy and flood-prone terrain typical of the Kosi megafan region.

== Administration ==
The subdivision is one of four in Supaul district. It consists of two Community Development Blocks:

- Triveniganj CD Block
- Chhatapur CD Block

The Sub-Divisional Officer (SDO) for Triveniganj is based at the Sub Division Office, Triveniganj (PIN 852139).

== Demographics ==
According to the 2011 Census of India:

- Triveniganj CD Block: population 322,477 (167,461 males; 155,016 females).
- Chhatapur CD Block: population 286,456 (148,676 males; 137,780 females).

The subdivision’s combined population was 608,933 (316,137 males; 292,796 females), with a sex ratio of about 926 females per 1,000 males.

The combined literate population was 284,010, giving a literacy rate of about 46.7%.

== Economy ==
Agriculture is the mainstay of the local economy. Paddy and other crops typical of the Kosi floodplain are cultivated. The District Industrial Potential Survey notes the potential for agro-processing and rice mills in the region.

== Transport ==
The subdivision is connected to the rest of the district by national and state highways as well as rural roads. Supaul district has about 133 km of national highways and 229 km of state highways. Railway lines in the district total 85 km.

== Education and public services ==
The Sub-Divisional Hospital at Triveniganj provides healthcare facilities to the subdivision. Government schools and residential institutions operate in both blocks under the Bihar Education Department.

== See also ==
- Supaul district
- Triveniganj
