= Triveniganj Assembly constituency =

Coordinates: 26°08′N 86°53′E

Triveniganj
- Constituency No. 44 for the Bihar Legislative Assembly

Constituency details
- Country: India
- Region: East India
- State: Bihar
- District: Supaul
- Established: 1957
- Total electors: 301,120

Member of Legislative Assembly
- 18th Bihar Legislative Assembly
- Incumbent Sonam Rani Sardar
- Party: JD(U)
- Alliance: NDA
- Elected year: 2025

Triveniganj Assembly constituency is an assembly constituency in Supaul district in the Indian state of Bihar. It is reserved for scheduled castes. It was an open seat earlier.

== Overview ==
Per Delimitation of Parliamentary and Assembly constituencies Order, 2008, No. 44 Triveniganj Assembly constituency (SC) is composed of the following: Triveniganj and Pratapganj community development blocks.

Triveniganj Assembly constituency is part of No. 8 Supaul (Lok Sabha constituency).

== Members of the Legislative Assembly ==
Year	Name	Party
1957	Yogeshwar Jha	Indian National Congress
1957	Tulmohan Ram	Indian National Congress
1962	Khub Lal Mahto	Indian National Congress
1967	Anup Lal Yadav	Samyukta Socialist Party
1969	Anup Lal Yadav	Samyukta Socialist Party
1972	Anup Lal Yadav	Samyukta Socialist Party
1977	Anup Lal Yadav	Janata Party
1980	Jagdish Mandal	Indian National Congress (I)
1985	Anup Lal Yadav	Lokdal
1990	Anup Lal Yadav	Janata Dal
1995	Vishwa Mohan Kumar	Indian National Congress
2000	Anup Lal Yadav	Rashtriya Janata Dal
2005	Vishwa Mohan Kumar	Lok Janshakti Party
2005	Vishwa Mohan Kumar	Janata Dal (United)
2009^	Dileshwar Kamait	Janata Dal (United)
2010	Amla Devi	Janata Dal (United)
2015	Veena Bharti	Janata Dal (United)
2020	Veena Bharti	Janata Dal (United)
2025	Sonam Rani Sardar	Janata Dal (United)

== Election results ==
=== 2025 ===
2025 Bihar Legislative Assembly election: Triveniganj
Party	Candidate	Votes	%	±%
JD(U)	Sonam Rani Sardar	105,262	47.48	+2.64
RJD	Santosh Kumar	99,579	44.92	+1.79
JSP	Pradeep Ram	4,490	2.03	
Rashtriya Jansambhavna Party	Jitendra Ram	4,246	1.92	
BSP	Sanjay Ram	3,965	1.79	
NOTA	None of the above	4,153	1.87	−0.13
Majority		5,683	2.56	+0.85
Turnout		221,695	72.84	+10.91
JD(U) hold		Swing		

=== 2020 ===
2020 Bihar Legislative Assembly election: Triveniganj
Party	Candidate	Votes	%	±%
JD(U)	Veena Bharti	79,458	44.84	▼12.69
RJD	Santosh Kumar	76,427	43.13	
LJP	Renulata Bharti	5,194	2.93	▼21.06
VBA	Rabindra Kumar Chaupal	3,002	1.69	
Jai Maha Bharath Party	Ranjan Kumar Sardar	2,629	1.48	
LPSP	Shankar Kumar Suman	2,372	1.34	
Mazdoor Kirayedar Vikas Party	Sikendra Paswan	2,123	1.2	
NOTA	None of the above	3,546	2.0	▼2.2
Majority		3,031	1.71	▼31.83
Turnout		177,208	61.93	▲1.51
JD(U) hold		Swing		

=== 2015 ===
2015 Bihar Legislative Assembly election: Triveniganj
Party	Candidate	Votes	%	±%
JD(U)	Veena Bharti	89,869	57.53	
LJP	Anant Kumar Bharti	37,469	23.99	
JAP(L)	Amla Devi	7,340	4.7	
Independent	Sanjay Sardar	3,996	2.56	
Bharat Nirman Party	Subash Rajak	3,774	2.42	
Samajwadi Janata Dal Democratic	Ram Narayan Chaupal	2,390	1.53	
BSP	Mahendra Ram	1,824	1.17	
CPI(ML)L	Upender Sideo	1,690	1.08	
NOTA	None of the above	6,555	4.2	
Majority		52,400	33.54	
Turnout		156,215	60.42	
