= Pipra, Supaul Assembly constituency =

Coordinates: 26°09′11″N 86°48′16″E

Pipra, Supaul
- Constituency No. - for the Bihar Legislative Assembly

Constituency details
- Country: India
- Region: East India
- State: Bihar
- District: Supaul
- Established: 2008
- Total electors: 305,165
- Reservation: None

Member of Legislative Assembly
- 18th Bihar Legislative Assembly
- Incumbent Rambilash Kamat
- Party: JD(U)
- Alliance: NDA
- Elected year: 2025

Pipra is an Administrative Block & Nagar Panchayat in Supaul district in the Indian state of Bihar.

== About Pipra ==
Pipra is a Block in Supaul District of Bihar State, India. Pipra Block headquarters is Pipra town. It belongs to Kosi Division.

Pipra consists of 39 villages and 16 Panchayats. Lachhumandas Chak is the smallest village and Pathrajolhania is the biggest village. It is in the 57 m elevation (altitude).

== Demographics of Pipra ==
Maithili is the local language here. Also people speak Hindi, Urdu, Angika. Total population of Pipra Block is 157,779 living in 28,992 houses, spread across total 39 villages and 16 panchayats. Males are 81,912 and Females are 75,867.

== Overview ==
As per Delimitation of Parliamentary and Assembly constituencies Order, 2008, No. 42 Pipra Assembly constituency is composed of the following: Pipra and Kishanpur community development blocks; Veena, Laudh, Karhio, Amha, Hardi East and Hardi West gram panchayats of Supaul CD Block.

Pipra Assembly constituency is part of No. 8 Supaul (Lok Sabha constituency).

== Members of the Legislative Assembly ==
Year	Name	Party
Until 2008: Constituency did not exist
2010	Sujata Devi	Janata Dal (United)
2015	Yaduvansh Kumar	Rashtriya Janata Dal
2020	Rambilash Kamat	Janata Dal (United)
2025	Rambilash Kamat	Janata Dal (United)

== Election results ==
=== 2025 ===
Bihar Assembly election, 2025: Pipra (Supaul)
Party	Candidate	Votes	%	±%
JD(U)	Rambilash Kamat	107,041	48.0	▲2.65
CPI(ML)L	Anil Kumar	69,265	31.06	
Independent	Laxmi Kant Bharti	12,014	5.39	
JSP	Indradev Sah	5,519	2.47	
Independent	Hema Bharti	3,772	1.69	
SUCI(C)	Ramdev Yadav	2,460	1.1	
Rashtriya Jansambhavna Party	Anju Kumari	2,229	1.0	
BSP	Kalim	2,048	0.92	
NOTA	None of the above	10,691	4.79	▲3.34
Majority		37,776	16.94	▲6.35
Turnout		223,019	73.08	▲10.25
JD(U) hold		Swing		

=== 2020 ===
Bihar Assembly election, 2020: Pipra, Supaul
Party	Candidate	Votes	%	±%
JD(U)	Rambilash Kamat	82,388	45.35	
RJD	Vishwa Mohan Kumar	63,143	34.76	▼19.25
LJP	Shakuntala Prasad	5,660	3.12	
JAP(L)	Mahendra Sah	3,770	2.08	▲0.45
Proutist Sarva Samaj	Raju Kumar	3,563	1.96	
Independent	Mahendra Prasad Choudhary	3,055	1.68	▼0.18
The Plurals Party	Rajesh Kumar	2,923	1.61	
Independent	Amit Kumar Singh	2,508	1.38	
NCP	Om Prakash Roy	1,927	1.06	
NOTA	None of the above	2,633	1.45	▼1.04
Majority		19,245	10.59	▼12.27
Turnout		181,673	62.83	▲1.75
JD(U) gain from RJD		Swing		

=== 2015 ===
2015 Bihar Legislative Assembly election: Pipra, Supaul
Party	Candidate	Votes	%	±%
RJD	Yadubansh Kumar Yadav	85,944	54.01	
BJP	Vishwamohan Kumar	49,575	31.15	
BSP	Mahendra Sah	4,204	2.64	
CPI(M)	Nageshwar Prasad Yadav	3,507	2.2	
Independent	Mahendra Prasad Choudhary	2,961	1.86	
Independent	Shur Vir Kaladhar	2,899	1.82	
JAP(L)	Idrish	2,588	1.63	
Independent	Sudha Kar Jha	1,926	1.21	
SP	Mohammad Izhar	1,568	0.99	
NOTA	None of the above	3,960	2.49	
Majority		36,369	22.86	
Turnout		159,132	61.08	
