= Sukhpur Dayodhi =

Sukhpur Dyodhi
- Country: India
- State: Bihar
- District: Supaul
- Founded by: Late Thakur Mohan babu

Languages
  - Official: Maithili, Hindi
- Time zone: UTC+5:30 (IST)
- PIN: 852130
- Telephone code: 06473
- Vehicle registration: BR-20
- Coastline: 0 kilometres (0 mi)
- Nearest city: Supaul
- Literacy: 100%
- Lok Sabha constituency: Supaul

Sukhpur Dyodhi is a village in North Bihar. Sukhpur Dyodhi has fertile alluvial soil as it lies in the plains of Kosi. Climate of the village is mild and monsoon type. Summer is not as hot as compared to northern India, mainly due to its proximity to the eastern Himalayas, but temperature dips down to as cold as 8 °C (46 °F) during winter. Rain is mainly concentrated from May to September.

Most of the villagers are engaged in cultivation and business. On an average, three crops are obtained per year from the same piece of land. Major crops include rice, wheat, mung and corn. Mango and litchi are also major horticulture crops. Mango is major contribution to the farmers' income. Three large tracts of land namely Lalbagh, Kalibagh and Mamabagh are mango orchards yielding huge quantities of the choicest mangoes.

The education system of Sukhpur Dyodhi has six schools: High School, Sukhpur; Chetmani Middle School, Sukhpur; Prathmic School, Sukhpur; Harijan School; Sanskrit Madhya Vidyalaya; and Primary Girls' School. Sukhpur Dyodhi provides school education not only to Sukhpur but also its surrounding villages. The high school has a playground, allowing the villagers to engage in sports such as cricket, football and volleyball. Land for construction of all these schools was donated by Babu Chetmani Singh, scion of Sukhpur Dyodhi. There are many old temples in this village such as Thalha ka Mandir, Thakurbari, Durga Mandir, Shih Dawar, Kali Mandir, Jivach ji Mandir. There are a few old historical buildings also. During Durga Puja, a grand fair is organised in the village.
