= Bahoranpur, Kotla =

Village in Uttar Pradesh, India

Bahoranpur
- Village
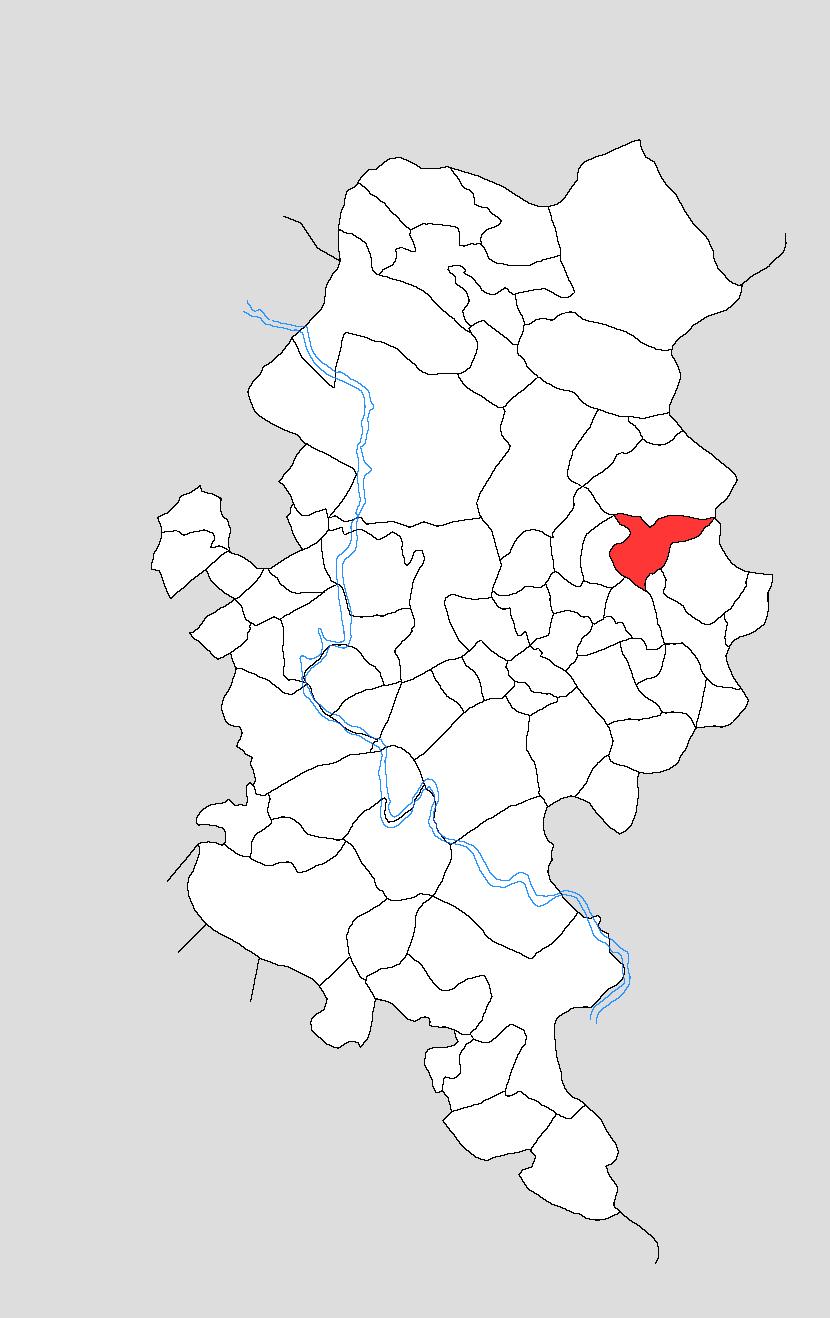
- Map showing Bahoranpur in Kotla block

- Location in Uttar Pradesh, India
- Coordinates: 27.28699°N 78.45840°E
- Country: India
- State: Uttar Pradesh
- District: Firozabad
- Tehsil: Firozabad

Area
  - Total: 1.805 km^{2} (0.697 sq mi)

Population (2011)
  - Total: 1,309
  - Density: 725.2/km^{2} (1,878/sq mi)
- Time zone: UTC+5:30 (IST)
- PIN: 283203

Bahoranpur (Bahoranpur) is a village in Kotla block of Firozabad district, Uttar Pradesh. As of 2011, it has a population of 1,309, in 209 households.

== Demographics ==
As of 2011, Bahoranpur had a population of 1,309, in 209 households. This population was 53.2% male (696) and 46.8% female (613). The 0-6 age group numbered 231 (120 male and 111 female), making up 17.6% of the total population. 902 residents were members of Scheduled Castes, or 68.9% of the total.

The 1981 census recorded Bahoranpur as having a population of 602 people (338 male and 264 female), in 90 households and 89 physical houses.

The 1961 census recorded Bahoranpur as comprising 2 hamlets, with a total population of 253 people (137 male and 116 female), in 61 households and 31 physical houses. The area of the village was given as 452 acres.

== Infrastructure ==
As of 2011, Bahoranpur had 1 primary school; it did not have any healthcare facilities. Drinking water was provided by hand pump and tube well/borehole; there were no public toilets. The village did not have a post office or public library; there was at least some access to electricity for all purposes. Streets were made of both kachcha and pakka materials.
