= Nirmali Assembly constituency =

Coordinates: 26°18′02″N 86°34′20″E

Nirmali
- Constituency No. 41 for the Bihar Legislative Assembly

Constituency details
- Country: India
- Region: East India
- State: Bihar
- District: Supaul
- Lok Sabha constituency: 8. Supaul
- Established: 1951
- Total electors: 304,066
- Reservation: None

Member of Legislative Assembly
- 18th Bihar Legislative Assembly
- Incumbent Aniruddha Prasad Yadav
- Party: JD(U)
- Alliance: NDA
- Elected year: 2025

Nirmali Assembly constituency is an assembly constituency in Supaul district in the Indian state of Bihar.

== Overview ==
As per Delimitation of Parliamentary and Assembly constituencies Order, 2008, No. 41 Nirmali Assembly constituency is composed of the following: Nirmali, Raghopur and Saraigarh Bhaptiyahi community development blocks.

Nirmali Assembly constituency is part of No. 8 Supaul (Lok Sabha constituency).

== Members of the Legislative Assembly ==
Year	Name	Party
1952	Kamta Prasad Gupta	Indian National Congress
1957-2008: Constituency defunct
2010	Aniruddha Prasad Yadav	Janata Dal (United)
2015	Aniruddha Prasad Yadav	Janata Dal (United)
2020	Aniruddha Prasad Yadav	Janata Dal (United)
2025	Aniruddha Prasad Yadav	Janata Dal (United)

== Election results ==
=== 2025 ===
2025 Bihar Legislative Assembly election: Nirmali
Party	Candidate	Votes	%	±%
JD(U)	Aniruddha Prasad Yadav	118,904	53.28	+3.95
RJD	Baidyanath Mehta	81,594	36.56	+10.67
JSP	Ram Pravesh Kumar Yadav	6,877	3.08	
Independent	Siya Ram Mandal	2,992	1.34	
AAP	Chandan Kumar	2,510	1.12	
NOTA	None of the above	6,240	2.8	+0.25
Majority		37,310	16.72	−6.72
Turnout		223,169	73.39	+10.29
JD(U) hold		Swing		

=== 2020 ===
2020 Bihar Legislative Assembly election: Nirmali
Party	Candidate	Votes	%	±%
JD(U)	Aniruddha Prasad Yadav	92,439	49.33	+1.79
RJD	Yaduvansh Kumar	48,517	25.89	
RLSP	Arjun Prasad Mehta	12,725	6.79	
JAP(L)	Vijay Kumar Yadav	8,886	4.74	−1.23
LJP	Gautam Kumar	6,345	3.39	
Independent	Aman Kumar Samajsevi	3,175	1.69	
Independent	Manoj Kumar	2,392	1.28	
Independent	Gyanshanker Choudhary	2,031	1.08	
NOTA	None of the above	4,781	2.55	−1.45
Majority		43,922	23.44	+9.14
Turnout		187,394	63.1	+0.97
JD(U) hold		Swing		

=== 2015 ===
2015 Bihar Legislative Assembly election: Nirmali
Party	Candidate	Votes	%	±%
JD(U)	Anirudh Prasad Yadav	79,600	47.54	
BJP	Ram Kumar Roy	55,649	33.24	
JAP(L)	Vijay Kumar Yadav	10,001	5.97	
Independent	Shrawan Kumar Chaudhary	2,728	1.63	
Independent	Ramdev Sharma	2,353	1.41	
SP	Gautam Kumar	1,626	0.97	
BSP	Binod Kumar Sahu	1,591	0.95	
Akhil Bhartiya Mithila Party	Laxmi Kant Jha	1,504	0.9	
NOTA	None of the above	6,699	4.0	
Majority		23,951	14.3	
Turnout		167,436	62.13	
