= Shibnagar, Maldah =

Village in West Bengal, India

Shibnagar
- Village
- Location within West Bengal Location within India
- Coordinates: 25°10′22″N 88°02′19″E
- Country: India
- State: West Bengal
- District: Maldah
- Block: Ratua II

Government
  - Type: Sarpanch

Area
  - Total: 6.26 km^{2} (2.42 sq mi)
- Elevation: 30 m (98 ft)

Population (2011)
  - Total: 8,298
  - Density: 1,330/km^{2} (3,430/sq mi)

Languages
  - Local: Bengali
- Time zone: UTC+5:30 (IST)
- PIN: 732102
- STD code: 03512
- Vehicle registration: WB-65/WB-66

Shibnagar is a village in Maldah district, West Bengal, India. It is located within the Siliguri Corridor, 21 kilometres northwest of the district seat Malda. The village's population was 8,298 as of 2011.

== Geography ==
Shibnagar is located between the Mahananda river and Nagri river. It covers an area of 626 hectares.

== Demographics ==
As of the year 2011, the population of Shibnagar was 8,298, of which 4,222 were male and 4,076 were female. The working population constituted 30.81% of the total population. The average literacy rate was 49.10%, with 2,073 of the male residents and 1,959 of the female residents being literate.
