= Aniruddha Prasad Yadav =

Indian politician

Member of Bihar Legislative Assembly
- Incumbent
- Assumed office 2010
- Preceded by: Kamta Prasad Gupta
- Constituency: Nirmali

Personal details
- Born: 20 May 1949 (age 77) Vill+ PO Chandpipar, Supaul, India
- Party: Janata Dal (United)
- Education: Intermediate (Science)
- Profession: Politician

Aniruddha Prasad Yadav is an Indian politician. He was elected to the Bihar Legislative Assembly from Kishanpur in 2005 and Nirmali in the 2010 Bihar Legislative Assembly as a member of the Janata Dal (United).
