= Jagdishpur subdivision =

Administrative subdivision in Bhojpur district, Bihar, India

- Subdivision
- Location in Bihar, India Jagdishpur subdivision (India)
- Coordinates: 25.4592456°N 84.4170010°E
- Country: India
- State: Bihar
- District: Bhojpur district
- Headquarters: Jagdishpur

Area
  - Total: 232.13 km^{2} (89.63 sq mi)

Population (2011)
  - Total: 263,959
  - Density: 1,137.1/km^{2} (2,945.1/sq mi)

Languages
  - Official: Hindi
- Time zone: UTC+05:30 (IST)
- PIN: 802158
- Vehicle registration: BR-03

Jagdishpur subdivision is an administrative subdivision of Bhojpur district in the Indian state of Bihar. Its administrative headquarters is the town of Jagdishpur. As recorded in the 2011 Census of India the subdivision covers an area of approximately 232.13 km^{2} and had a population of 263,959.

== Geography ==
Jagdishpur subdivision lies in the plains of central Bihar, south-west of the district headquarter Arrah. The area is part of the broad Gangetic alluvial plain — largely flat, fertile and composed of recent alluvium deposited by the Ganges and its tributaries. Soils are generally silty and the subdivision has extensive agricultural land. Parts of the district, including low-lying tracts near the Ganges floodplain, are prone to seasonal inundation during the monsoon; groundwater quality and local hydrogeology have been documented by the Central Ground Water Board.

== Administration ==
Jagdishpur subdivision is one of three sub-divisions in Bhojpur district (the others being Ara Sadar and Piro). The subdivision contains three Community Development (CD) Blocks as listed on the official Bhojpur district portal:

- Jagdishpur block
- Bihiya (Behea) block
- Shahpur block.

The Sub-Divisional Magistrate (SDM) and associated offices for Jagdishpur handle routine administration, revenue and development work for the three blocks.

== Demographics ==
As per the 2011 Census (District Census Handbook — Bhojpur; PCA/Town & Village Directory), Jagdishpur subdivision had a total population of 263,959 (rural population 231,512; urban population 32,447 — the latter being the Jagdishpur nagar panchayat).

Key indicators from the 2011 census for the subdivision and its urban centre include:

- Total population (2011): 263,959 (subdivision).
- Jagdishpur (town) population (2011): 32,447.
- Literacy: overall subdivision literacy was recorded in the DCHB (see Part B/PCA tables for block-wise rates); the town of Jagdishpur had a literacy rate of about 68.5% according to the town PCA.
- Sex ratio: the CD-block/subdivision sex ratio was recorded in the DCHB (subdivision sex ratio ~909 females per 1000 males).
- Scheduled Castes and Scheduled Tribes: the DCHB/PCA tables record the SC proportion for the subdivision at roughly 13–14% and ST share below 1% (2011).

== Economy ==
The economy of Jagdishpur subdivision is predominantly agricultural, occupying a high share of cultivated land with major crops including paddy and wheat; irrigation coverage and land-use statistics are given in the District Census Handbook. The DCHB also records the worker classification (cultivators, agricultural labourers, household industry and other workers) showing agriculture as the principal occupation in rural areas, with market and service activities concentrated in Jagdishpur town. Industrial and mineral activity in the subdivision is limited, as summarised in the DCHB village/town directories and the block-level tables.

== Transport ==
Transport infrastructure in the subdivision includes road connections to Ara (Arrah) and neighbouring towns; village-level transport availability (roads, bus services) is tabulated in the DCHB Town & Village Directory. The town of Jagdishpur is served by local and regional road links and lies within reachable distance of Ara railway station for long-distance rail services (see DCHB and district transport entries for specifics).

== Education and public services ==
The District Census Handbook lists educational and public health facilities at block and village level: a majority of villages in the subdivision have at least one primary school, and a number of villages and the town have secondary schools and health sub-centres; the DCHB village directory and block-level tables provide the full inventory of schools, primary health centres (PHCs), sub-centres and other public services. Public distribution outlets, post offices and banking facilities are also enumerated in the DCHB.

== See also ==
- Bhojpur district
- Jagdishpur
- Bihiya
