= Sonam Rani Sardar =

Indian politician

Sonam Rani Sardar (born 1998) is an Indian politician from Bihar. She is a member of the Bihar Legislative Assembly from Triveniganj Assembly constituency in Supaul district which is reserved for members of Scheduled Caste community. She won the 2025 Bihar Legislative Assembly election representing Janata Dal (United). She polled 105,262 votes and defeated Santosh Kumar of the Rashtriya Janata Dal by a margin of 5,683 votes.
