= Muzaffarpur East subdivision =

Administrative subdivision in Muzaffarpur district, Bihar, India

Muzaffarpur East मुजफ्फरपुर पूर्वी
- Subdivision
- Location in Bihar, India Muzaffarpur East (India)
- Coordinates: 26.1249601°N 85.3806329°E
- Country: India
- State: Bihar
- District: Muzaffarpur district
- Community development blocks: Aurai, Bandra, Bochahan, Gaighat, Katra, Mushahari
- Time zone: UTC+05:30 (IST)

Muzaffarpur East (Hindi: मुजफ्फरपुर पूर्वी) is an administrative subdivision (anumandal) of Muzaffarpur district in the Indian state of Bihar. The subdivision comprises six community development blocks and is administered by a Sub-Divisional Officer (SDO) under the district administration.

== Administration ==
The subdivision is headed by the Sub-Divisional Officer (SDO) for Muzaffarpur East. It comprises the following six community development blocks: Aurai; Bandra; Bochahan; Gaighat; Katra; and Mushahari.

Official contact details for the SDO and the Block Development Officers are published on the district website.

== Geography ==
The subdivision lies in the eastern part of Muzaffarpur district in north Bihar. Its central coordinates are 26.1249601°N 85.3806329°E. The area forms part of the Gangetic plains.

== Demographics ==
Block-wise population figures from the 2011 Census of India are available in the District Census Handbook (Muzaffarpur). For official population data of Aurai, Bandra, Bochaha, Gaighat, Katra and Musahari, consult the District Census Handbook: Muzaffarpur (Part A and Part B, Census of India 2011).
