= Arwal subdivision =

Administrative subdivision in Arwal district, Bihar, India

- Subdivision
- Location in Bihar, India Arwal subdivision (India)
- Coordinates: 25.2439951°N 84.6673705°E
- Country: India India
- State: Bihar
- District: Arwal district
- Seat: Arwal

Area
  - Total: 634.23 km^{2} (244.88 sq mi)

Population (2011)
  - Total: 700,843
  - Density: 1,105.0/km^{2} (2,862.0/sq mi)

Languages
  - Official: Hindi, Urdu
- Time zone: UTC+05:30 (IST)
- PIN: 804401
- Vehicle registration: BR-56

Arwal subdivision is an administrative subdivision in Arwal district, in the Indian state of Bihar, with its headquarters at the town of Arwal. The subdivision is coterminous with Arwal district (the district comprises a single subdivision) and contains the district headquarters and the district's rural and urban settlements. The subdivision covers an area of 634.23 km² and had a total population of 700,843 at the 2011 Census of India.

== Geography ==
Arwal subdivision lies in south-western Bihar on the plains adjoining the Son (Sone) River basin. The subdivision is primarily flat alluvial plain with fertile soils derived from recent alluvium. The Son River and its tributaries influence the drainage of the subdivision; parts of the district adjoining the Son are low-lying and prone to seasonal flooding during the monsoon. Groundwater resources, aquifer characteristics and district-level hydrogeology have been studied and documented by the Central Ground Water Board (CGWB) for the Arwal area.

== Administration ==
Arwal district contains a single subdivision, Arwal. The subdivision is divided administratively into five Community Development (CD) blocks: Arwal, Kaler, Karpi, Kurtha and Sonbhadra Banshi Suryapur. The town of Arwal is the subdivision (and district) headquarters. The district administration provides block-level listings and contact details on its official portal.

== Demographics ==
As per the 2011 Census (District Census Handbook and related PCA tables), the subdivision (equivalently the district) had a total population of 700,843 (363,497 males and 337,346 females). The rural population was 648,994 and the urban population 51,849. The overall literacy and sex-ratio figures, and the Scheduled Caste / Scheduled Tribe proportions are reported in the DCHB and district release tables: the district sex ratio and literacy figures are drawn from the Census 2011 datasets and the District Census Handbook.

- Total population (2011): 700,843.
- Rural population (2011): 648,994; Urban population (2011): 51,849.
- Literacy, sex ratio, and social-group (SC/ST) proportions are reported in the DCHB and PCA tables (see references).

== Economy ==
The economy of the subdivision is predominantly agrarian and mirrors the district-level economy described in official district documents and the Census DCHB. Major crops include paddy, wheat and pulses; agriculture, allied activities and rural labour are the main livelihoods. District- and block-level infrastructure, irrigation and agricultural particulars are summarised in the District Census Handbook and district administration publications.

== Transport ==
Road is the principal mode of transport serving the subdivision; national and state highways provide inter-district connections to Patna, Jehanabad, Aurangabad and neighbouring districts. The district administration's "How to reach" / transport information and the DCHB village-and-town directory provide official notes on road connectivity. The nearest major railway and airport facilities cited in district official documents are at Jehanabad / Anugrah Narayan Road (rail) and Patna (airport). The district transport office and RTO services for the district are administered from Arwal (RTO series BR-56 as recorded in official Bihar government election/administrative documents).

== Education and public services ==
Government and government-aided primary, upper primary and secondary schools, as well as health centres (sub-centres, primary health centres and rural hospitals), are listed in the District Census Handbook (village and town directory) and on the district administration portal. The DCHB provides block-wise counts of educational institutions and health facilities; the district website publishes contact details for the education and health departments and lists colleges and hospitals in the district.

== See also ==
- Arwal district
- Arwal
