= Buxar subdivision =

Administrative subdivision in Buxar district, Bihar, India

- Sub-division
- Location in Bihar, India Buxar subdivision (India)
- Coordinates: 25.5788833°N 83.9772230°E
- Country: India
- State: Bihar
- District: Buxar district
- Headquarters: Buxar

Area
  - Total: 1,703 km^{2} (658 sq mi)

Population (2011)
  - Total: 779,022
  - Density: 457.4/km^{2} (1,185/sq mi)

Languages
  - Official: Hindi, Urdu
- Time zone: UTC+5:30 (IST)
- PIN: 802101 (Buxar H.O.).
- Vehicle registration: BR-44

Buxar subdivision is an administrative sub-division of Buxar district in the Indian state of Bihar. The subdivision's administrative headquarters is the town of Buxar. As per the 2011 Census of India (DCHB / PCA), the subdivision comprises four community development blocks — Buxar, Itarhi, Chausa and Rajpur — and had a combined population of 779,022 in 2011 (sum of block populations from Census 2011).

== Geography ==
Buxar subdivision lies in the western part of Buxar district, on the alluvial Gangetic plain. The Ganges (Ganga) river forms the district's (and the subdivision's northern) boundary in parts and influences local drainage and soil patterns; the Karmanasa also drains parts of the district near Chausa. The terrain is largely flat lowland with fertile alluvial soils and is intensively cultivated. Low-lying areas adjacent to the Ganges are prone to seasonal flooding during the monsoon; groundwater and surface-water conditions are discussed in central government hydrogeological studies of the district.

== Administration ==
Buxar subdivision is one of two sub-divisions in Buxar district and contains the following community development (CD) blocks as listed on the district's official portal:

- Buxar
- Itarhi
- Chausa
- Rajpur

Each block is administered by a Block Development Officer (BDO) and the subdivision is administered by the Sub-Divisional Magistrate (SDM) based at Buxar.

== Demographics ==
According to the 2011 Census of India (District Census Handbook and Primary Census Abstract), the combined population of the four blocks forming Buxar subdivision was 779,022 in 2011 (sum of CD block populations: Buxar, Itarhi, Chausa and Rajpur). The subdivision shows characteristics typical of the district: a majority rural population, high dependence on agriculture, and literacy and sex-ratio figures close to district averages. District-level figures (for context) — total district population 1,706,352; average literacy 70.14%; sex ratio 922 — are provided in the District Census Handbook and district statistical summaries.

=== Scheduled Castes and Scheduled Tribes ===
Block-level data in the DCHB/PCA show the proportion of Scheduled Castes and Scheduled Tribes within each block; the district contains a notable SC population and a smaller ST population (see the DCHB / PCA tables for exact figures by block).

== Economy ==
The economy of Buxar subdivision is predominantly agricultural. Major crops and cropped area, irrigation patterns and land-use statistics are reported in the District Census Handbook and in the Central Ground Water Board report for Buxar; irrigation infrastructure (canals and tube wells), cropped area, and cropping intensity are important features of the local rural economy. Small-scale agro-based and service activities are also present in the subdivision towns and market centres.

== Transport ==
The subdivision is served by road and rail links centred on the district headquarters town of Buxar and nearby towns (for example, Dumraon in the neighbouring sub-division). National and state highways and a network of district roads connect the subdivision to neighbouring districts and to Patna. Railway connections on the East Central Railway network provide freight and passenger services; bus and other road transport services link the block headquarters and villages to the district headquarters. Administrative documents and the DCHB provide lists of main roads and transport facilities in the district and blocks.

== Education and public services ==
The District Census Handbook (Part A — Village & Town Directory) lists educational and health facilities (primary and secondary schools, primary health centres, sub-centres and hospitals) available in block towns and villages. The subdivision's public services are provided through block-level and district-level networks — primary schools and health sub-centres in villages, community health centres and secondary schools at block headquarters, and district hospitals/administrative offices at Buxar town. For precise institution-level counts and locations consult the DCHB village/town directory and the district portal's health and education directories.

== See also ==
- Buxar district
- Buxar
- Chausa
- Rajpur
