= Rampur, Kaimur =

Rampur Rāmpur
- Village
- Location in Bihar, India Rampur (India)
- Coordinates: 24.94928°N 83.77749°E
- Country: India
- State: Bihar
- District: Kaimur

Area
  - Total: 1.23 km^{2} (0.47 sq mi)
- Elevation: 104 m (341 ft)

Population (2011)
  - Total: 575
  - Density: 467/km^{2} (1,210/sq mi)

Languages
  - Official: Bhojpuri, Hindi
- Time zone: UTC+5:30 (IST)

Rampur is a village and community development block in Kaimur district of Bihar, India. As of 2011, it had a population of 575, in 94 households. The total block population was 88,876, in 14,110 households.

== Demographics ==
As of 2011, the sex ratio of Rampur block was 929 females to every 1000 males. The sex ratio was slightly higher in the 0-6 age group, at 935. Out of the total block population of 88,876, 0-6 year olds numbered 16,113, or about 18%. Members of scheduled castes made up 29.98% of Rampur block residents (the highest proportion in Kaimur district), and members of scheduled tribes made up 1.48%. The block's literacy rate was 68.12% (78.30% in men and 57.10% in women).

Most of the block's workforce was engaged in agriculture in 2011, with 21.34% of workers being cultivators who owned or leased their own land and another 63.62% being agricultural labourers who worked someone else's land for money. Another 3.14% were household industry workers, and the remaining 11.89% were other workers. The block's workers were mostly male, with 20,243 being male and 7,736 being female. A higher proportion of women than men were agricultural labourers and household industry workers, while a higher proportion of men than women were cultivators and other workers.

== Villages ==
Rampur block contains the following 137 villages:

Village name	Total land area (hectares)	Population (in 2011)
Kharsota	93	0
Gamharia	50	833
Sonbarsa	51	452
Patna	27	991
Panail English	98	195
Narjo	118	0
Kargain	342	1,194
Barkagawan	26	2,672
Sihora	25	0
Ujari Danrivan	25	0
Nawadih	111	771
Kukurha English	61	0
Kukurha	35	975
Thiloin	244	1,359
Dubauli	62	218
Siswar	208	1,399
Shivpur	155	1,221
Tenua	195	2,533
Dhaupokhar	85	1,102
Kurari	260	2,522
Kataya	83	0
Sisarma	49	0
Nisja	98	950
Pali	132	921
Majhaganwan	43	251
Jalalpur	110	1,227
Bhaluhan	47	847
Basantpur	48	0
Lilli	75	607
Maheshpur	79	212
Kakarhi	33	0
Patila	51	0
Damodarpur	49	579
Dubauli	45	20
Banauli	68	733
Basni	80	820
Gangapur	40	568
Chanrudean	39	156
Digha	23	0
Tetihan	37	159
Akorhi	262	2,236
Itawan	62	444
Sonara	40	624
Karaunda	85	415
Belawan	290	2,839
Rampur	58	262
Basuhari	175	640
Chamariawan	91	609
Baramhtali	27	0
Ekauni	126	1,050
Gonupur	25	186
Bahera	53	342
Madhopur	41	583
Kuran	19	0
Karaundi Khurd	30	0
Maidanr Khurd	38	500
Maidanr Kalan	80	380
Kudarwar Khurd	46	222
Pasain	219	1,373
Nirbispur	69	400
Khajura	481	1,339
Sonbarsa	57	496
Bichhiya	59	911
Kurtha	41	397
Majhiyawan	157	1,176
Tarawan	203	1,252
Kharenda	209	1,544
Bhorean	116	1,431
Lewa	34	0
Punawan	91	914
Sonawan Purab Patti	43	462
Sonawan Pachhim Patti	42	434
Harjipur	44	109
Chanela	173	0
Hunadari	161	948
Uchanar	121	840
Panapur	110	854
Nauhatta	175	2,308
Ahirawan	99	1,132
Hundara	72	256
Hundara	40	273
Hundara	47	0
Jagmohna	54	113
Chanki	31	548
Baheri	163	2,533
Pachhera	74	718
Atrauli	36	0
Uphrauli	76	245
Tulshipur	16	0
Lohandi	49	682
Thakurhat	40	692
Parmalpur	32	0
Bijra	124	604
Jhalkhora	38	454
Rampur (block headquarters)	123	575
Sawar	455	4,162
Arazi Baghi	18	0
Bazidpur	17	272
Baghi	64	658
Jhali	151	2,329
Panrepur	44	882
Majhiawan	125	1,265
Harnatanr	29	0
Bidesarpur	38	0
Barli	65	1,055
Dariawan	28	196
Bogadahan	28	0
Maraicha	23	483
Salempur	36	219
Maraicha	171	61
Amawan	317	4,378
Diyari	55	516
Lakhandahi	130	466
Lalapur	168	268
Hasanpura	59	241
Lewa	59	1,103
Benipur	65	0
Admapur	193	17
Burhbarawan	463	0
Barawan	105	1,547
Ibrahimpur	225	0
Gorwar	397	0
Bakharam	158	40
Baradih	94	636
Dhanawal	379	201
Rajandih	72	0
Rajadeo	88	15
Rajpur	52	0
Bhitribandh	50	2,872
Nawadih	49	14
Gamhirpur	41	0
Larui Kharui	75	0
Dharu Khoh	918	0
Kanjiari	1,611	0
Bairiadih	1,077	0
Karamchat	1,031	1,148
Kumhiya	95	0
