= Anup Lal Yadav =

Indian politician (1923–2013)

Anup Lal Yadav (5 October 1923 – 9 August 2013) was an Indian politician. He was MP for Saharsa and three time continuous MLA from Triveniganj. He served as minister in different department and did tremendous work in his field. He died in August 2013.
