= Muzaffarpur West subdivision =

Administrative subdivision in Muzaffarpur district, Bihar, India

- Subdivision
- Location in Bihar, India Muzaffarpur West subdivision (India)
- Coordinates: 26.1254251°N 85.3807348°E
- Country: India
- State: Bihar
- Division: Tirhut
- District: Muzaffarpur district
- Headquarters: Muzaffarpur
- Time zone: UTC+5:30 (IST)

Muzaffarpur West subdivision is one of the two administrative subdivisions of Muzaffarpur district in the Indian state of Bihar. It is part of the Tirhut. The Sub-Divisional Officer (SDO), Muzaffarpur (West) is the administrative head of the subdivision and is responsible for revenue administration, implementation of development programmes and maintenance of law and order.

== Geography ==
Muzaffarpur West subdivision lies to the west of the city of Muzaffarpur. The coordinates given in the infobox indicate the approximate location of the Sub-Divisional Office (West). The subdivision covers agricultural plains and semi-urban localities that form part of the Muzaffarpur urban agglomeration.

== Administrative divisions ==
According to the official district administration, Muzaffarpur district is divided into two subdivisions, East and West. The Muzaffarpur West subdivision consists of the following seven Community Development Blocks:

- Kanti
- Kurhani
- Marwan
- Paroo
- Sahebganj
- Motipur (also referred to as Baruraj in some records)
- Saraiya

== Governance and administration ==
The Sub-Divisional Office (SDO), Muzaffarpur (West) administers the subdivision. The SDO is responsible for land and revenue matters, coordination of development schemes, and supervision of block-level officers. Official notices and tenders issued by the SDO (West) are published on the district website.

The district telephone directory provides official contact numbers for the SDO (West) and other officers of the district administration. Emergency and nodal contacts, including those of the subdivision, are also listed on the district website.

== Demographics ==
Population and socio-economic data for Muzaffarpur West subdivision are recorded in the District Census Handbook (Muzaffarpur) prepared by the Census of India. The 2011 Census provides block-level figures, shown in the table below:

Population of blocks in Muzaffarpur West subdivision (2011 Census)
Block	Population (2011)
Kurhani	435,676
Motipur (Baruraj)	406,795
Paroo	361,662
Saraiya	331,651
Kanti	272,858
Sahebganj	241,438
Marwan	164,858

Additional details on literacy, sex ratio, household amenities and village-level data are available in Part A (Village and Town Directory) and Part B (Primary Census Abstract) of the District Census Handbook (Muzaffarpur).

== Economy and agriculture ==
Agriculture is the primary occupation across the rural blocks of the subdivision. The district is well known for litchi cultivation, and the Census Handbook records details of agricultural practices, land use and household livelihoods.

== Infrastructure and transport ==
Road networks connect the block headquarters of the subdivision to Muzaffarpur city and neighbouring districts. Railway stations in areas such as Kanti and Motipur provide regional connectivity. Information on public utilities and transport services is maintained by the district administration.
