= Triveniganj =

Triveniganj Tribeniganj
- Town
- Location in Bihar
- Coordinates: 26.128°N 86.889°E
- Country: India
- District: Supaul
- Elevation: 59 m (194 ft)

Languages
  - Official: Hindi, Maithli, English
- Time zone: UTC+5:30 (IST)
- PIN: 852139
- Telephone code: +91-6477
- Vehicle registration: BR 50
- Lok Sabha constituency: Supaul
- Vidhan Sabha constituency: Triveniganj
- Distance from Patna: 271 km (168 mi) NE (land)

Triveniganj is a town and a notified area in Supaul district in the Indian state of Bihar. It has 27 panchayats and 64 revenue villages.

== Geography ==
Triveniganj has an average elevation of 59 metres (193 feet).

== Demographics ==
As of 2011 Triveniganj had a population of 322,734. Males constitute 52%(168,014) of the population and females 48%(154,720). Triveniganj has an average literacy rate of 49.3%, lower than the national average of 74.04%: male literacy was 58.1%, and female literacy was 39.7%. In Triveniganj, 18.4% of the population was under 6 years of age.

== Railways ==
Triveniganj is served by the Supaul–Triveniganj railway line of East Central Railway zone.
