= Tarapur subdivision =

Administrative subdivision in Munger district, Bihar, India

- Subdivision
- Location in Bihar, India Tarapur subdivision (India)
- Coordinates: 25.0984925°N 86.6684791°E
- Country: India
- State: Bihar
- District: Munger
- Headquarters: Tarapur

Area
  - Total: 70 km^{2} (27 sq mi)

Population (2011)
  - Total: 110,214
  - Density: 1,600/km^{2} (4,100/sq mi)

Languages
  - Spoken: Hindi, Angika, Maithili
- Time zone: UTC+5:30 (IST)
- PIN: 813214
- Vehicle registration: BR-08

Tarapur subdivision is one of the three administrative subdivisions of Munger district in the Indian state of Bihar. Its headquarters is the town of Tarapur. The subdivision comprises predominantly rural areas along with two census towns and forms an administrative tier between the district and the block (community development) level.

== Geography ==
Tarapur subdivision lies in the eastern part of Munger district in the floodplain zone of southern Bihar. The terrain is largely flat alluvial plain formed by the Ganges and its tributaries; soils are generally alluvial with shallow local variations. Parts of the subdivision fall within areas noted by the Central Ground Water Board and district authorities for high groundwater use and periodic flooding during the monsoon season.

== Administration ==
Tarapur subdivision is administered from Tarapur town (sub-divisional headquarters). The subdivision contains the following Community Development (C.D.) Blocks:

- Tarapur
- Sangrampur
- Asarganj

These blocks (ankals) are the primary rural administrative units in the subdivision.

== Demographics ==
As per the 2011 Census of India (District Census Handbook and Primary Census Abstract), Tarapur subdivision (C.D. Block Tarapur and its associated towns/villages) had a total population of 110,214 (2011). The subdivision area recorded in district census tables is approximately 70 km² with a total population density corresponding to the 2011 figures. The delimitation of urban and rural population in 2011 shows two census towns within the block — Gazipur and Tarapur (town) — which together account for the subdivision's urban population; the remainder is rural. Key demographic indicators from the 2011 Census / DCHB are given in the official census publications.

According to the PCA/DCHB (2011):

- Total population (2011): 110,214.
- Urban population: the two census towns within the block (Gazipur and Tarapur) together form the urban component recorded in the census.
- Sex ratio, literacy, Scheduled Castes and Scheduled Tribes: detailed figures (sex ratio, literacy rate, SC/ST population totals and percentages) for Tarapur C.D. Block and its constituent towns/villages are provided in the DCHB/PCA tables published by the Office of the Registrar General & Census Commissioner, India.

== Economy ==
The economy of Tarapur subdivision is predominantly agrarian, with a majority of workers engaged in cultivation and agricultural labour as recorded in the District Census Handbook and PCA data. Local agricultural production recorded in district-level handbooks includes paddy, wheat and other seasonal crops; small trading and service activities are concentrated in the census towns and the block headquarters. The DCHB village/town directory and the census worker classification tables give the detailed occupational structure and main economic activities.

== Transport ==
Road connections in the subdivision are via district and state roads connecting Tarapur with the district headquarters Munger and neighbouring towns; public and private buses provide inter-block and inter-district services. The nearest major railway stations serving Munger district are Jamalpur Junction and Munger (Jamalpur–Munger area), which provide rail connectivity to the Sahibganj loop and mainline services; detailed village/town directory entries in the DCHB list road and rail access for individual habitations. The district administration's "How to Reach" and map pages list the primary road and rail approaches to the area.

== Education and public services ==
The District Census Handbook (village and town directories) lists the educational and public health infrastructure available in Tarapur subdivision: primary and upper primary schools, secondary schools, and health institutions such as Primary Health Centres (PHCs) and sub-centres located in block headquarters and larger villages/towns. The district administration also maintains school and hospital directories and block-level office contacts for Tarapur, Sangrampur and Asarganj. Detailed counts and locations of schools, anganwadis, and health centres appear in the DCHB and the district's public utilities directories.

== See also ==
- Bihar
- Munger district
- Tarapur
- Asarganj
