= Tekari subdivision =

Administrative subdivision in Gaya district, Bihar, India

- Subdivision
- Location in Bihar, India Tekari subdivision (India)
- Coordinates: 24.9335664°N 84.8416651°E
- Country: India
- State: Bihar
- District: Gaya
- Headquarters: Tekari

Area
  - Total: 237.06 km^{2} (91.53 sq mi)

Population (2011)
  - Total: 260,511
  - Density: 1,098.9/km^{2} (2,846.2/sq mi)

Languages
  - Official / Regional: Hindi (official); Magahi (regional)
- Time zone: UTC+5:30 (IST)
- PIN: 824236
- Vehicle registration: BR-02

Tekari subdivision (also recorded as Tikari in official census publications) is an administrative subdivision of Gaya district in the Indian state of Bihar. The administrative headquarters is located at the town of Tekari. The subdivision is one of four in Gaya district and comprises both rural areas and the Tekari Nagar Panchayat (town).

== Geography ==
Tekari subdivision is situated in the north-western part of Gaya district, centred near 24.9335664°N 84.8416651°E. The terrain is largely flat with some gentle undulations typical of the southern Gangetic plain. The district's main river, the Falgu, flows in the wider Gaya area, while most streams in the Tekari subdivision are seasonal. Groundwater in the area occurs in alluvial aquifers, and the Central Ground Water Board has undertaken resource assessment for sustainable management. According to the district disaster management plan, the area has limited flood hazard compared with northern Bihar, though low-lying areas may face waterlogging during heavy rainfall.

== Administration ==
Tekari subdivision is one of four revenue subdivisions of Gaya district. Its headquarters is located at Tekari. The subdivision consists of the following community development blocks:

- Konch
- Tekari
- Gurua
- Paraiya

== Demographics ==
According to the 2011 Census of India, Tekari subdivision had a population of 260,511 (135,196 males and 125,315 females) over an area of 237.06 km². The sex ratio was 927 females per 1,000 males. The literacy rate stood at 68.5% overall (79.5% male literacy and 56.5% female literacy). Scheduled Castes formed about 24.8% of the population, while Scheduled Tribes accounted for less than 0.1%.

== Economy ==
The economy of Tekari subdivision is primarily agricultural. Most workers are engaged in cultivation and agricultural labour, while small-scale trade and services are concentrated in Tekari town and block headquarters.

== Transport ==
Transport in the subdivision is supported by district and state highways along with rural roads connecting villages to Tekari town and to Gaya city. Bus services and road connectivity details are recorded in the District Census Handbook. The nearest major railway station is located at Gaya, the district headquarters.

== Education and public services ==
The District Census Handbook records the presence of primary and secondary schools, anganwadi centres, and health sub-centres in villages across the subdivision. Tekari town hosts block-level administrative offices, secondary schools, and a primary health centre serving the rural population.

== See also ==
- Bihar
- Gaya district
- Tekari
- Konch
- Paraiya
