= Dileshwar Kamait =

Indian politician (born 1946)

- Official portrait, 2019

Member of Parliament, Lok Sabha
- Incumbent
- Assumed office 23 May 2019
- Preceded by: Ranjeet Ranjan
- Constituency: Supaul, Bihar

Personal details
- Born: 2 February 1946 (age 80) LACHMINIYA TRIVENIGANJ, Bihar, India
- Party: Janata Dal (United)
- Spouse: Bina Devi (m. 1964)
- Children: 7 (3 sons and 4 daughters)
- Occupation: Politician; agriculturist; former civil servant

Dileshwar Kamait (born 2 February 1946) is an Indian politician and a member of parliament to the 17th and 18th Lok Sabha from Supaul Lok Sabha constituency, Bihar. He won the 2019 Indian general election being a Janata Dal (United) candidate. He is a member of Janata Dal (United).

Kamait is considered as a prominent leader of the Extremely Backward Castes in Janata Dal (United) from the Kosi region of Bihar. He was an officer in Indian Railways, until he decided to join politics in 2008. In 2009, he was elected to Bihar Legislative Assembly from Triveniganj Assembly constituency and in 2014 he contested the Lok Sabha election from Supaul Lok Sabha constituency. He was defeated in the 2014 elections, however, in 2019 he was elected to Lok Sabha, becoming a parliamentarian for the first time.

Kamait was victorious once again in 2024 Indian general election from Supaul Lok Sabha constituency and he was made the leader of Parliamentary Party of JDU in the Lok Sabha following this victory.
