= Surya Narayan Yadav (Indian politician) =

Indian politician

Member of Parliament, Lok Sabha
- In office 1989-1996
- Preceded by: Chandra Kishore Pathak
- Succeeded by: Dinesh Chandra Yadav
- Constituency: Saharsa, Bihar

Personal details
- Born: 23 July 1954 (age 71) Chandaur, Saharsa district, Bihar, India
- Party: Janata Dal

Surya Narayan Yadav is an Indian politician. He was a Member of Parliament, representing Saharsa, Bihar in the Lok Sabha the lower house of India's Parliament as a member of the Janata Dal.
