= Rajgir subdivision =

Administrative subdivision in Nalanda district, Bihar, India

- Subdivision
- Location in Bihar, India Rajgir subdivision (India)
- Coordinates: 25.0352741°N 85.4181158°E
- Country: India
- State: Bihar
- District: Nalanda
- Headquarters: Rajgir

Area
  - Total: 195 km^{2} (75 sq mi)

Population (2011)
  - Total: 130,183
  - Density: 668/km^{2} (1,730/sq mi)

Languages
  - Official: Hindi
- Time zone: UTC+05:30 (IST)
- PIN: 803116
- Vehicle registration: BR-21

Rajgir subdivision is an administrative subdivision (revenue sub-division) in Nalanda district in the Indian state of Bihar. The subdivision headquarters is the historic town of Rajgir. The subdivision is one of three sub-divisions in Nalanda district (the others being Biharsharif and Hilsa).

== Geography ==
Rajgir subdivision lies in the southern part of Nalanda district and includes the Rajgir Hills and adjoining plains. The topography is a mix of low hills (the Rajgir hill ranges) and alluvial plains of the southern Gangetic plain. The area has clay-loam to loam soils derived from recent alluvium. Groundwater characteristics and hydrogeology for the Rajgir area are described in the Central Ground Water Board (CGWB) district profile for Nalanda; the profile notes the presence of fractured crystalline rock in the Rajgir hills and alluvial aquifers in the surrounding plains and gives details on groundwater availability and quality for the block/area. The CGWB assessment also records that parts of the subdivision are affected by seasonal waterlogging and that groundwater development requires localised management measures.

The subdivision is drained by small tributaries feeding the larger rivers of the region; river channels and local drainage are described in the district and CGWB reports cited above. Seasonal flooding occurs in low-lying parts of the plain during the monsoon; the district administration maintains flood/relief plans for affected areas.

== Administration ==
Rajgir is a revenue sub-division of Nalanda district. According to the official district administration, Nalanda is divided into three sub-divisions and 20 community development (CD) blocks; Rajgir Sub-division corresponds to the Rajgir sub-district/tehsil and contains the Rajgir CD Block (headquartered at Rajgir town). The district portal and the Census District Handbook provide the administrative listing for the district.

- Community development block:
- Rajgir (headquarters: Rajgir)

== Demographics ==
As per the 2011 Census of India (Primary Census Abstract and District Census Handbook), Rajgir sub-district had a total population of 130,183 in 2011, of which the urban population (Rajgir Nagar Panchayat) was 41,587 and the rural population (Rajgir CD Block villages combined) was 88,596. The 2011 census data provide detailed figures for population by sex, literacy, child population (0–6), and Scheduled Castes/Scheduled Tribes at town, block and village levels; those tables are published in the District Census Handbook (Nalanda) Part A and Part B. Specific indicators such as literacy rate, sex ratio and SC/ST percentages for the sub-district and constituent units are recorded in the DCHB tables.

(For town- and village-level breakdowns, including population by sex, literacy rates, child population and Scheduled Castes/Scheduled Tribes, see the District Census Handbook — the PCA tables list the Rajgir Nagar Panchayat and all villages in Rajgir CD Block.)

== Economy ==
The economy of Rajgir subdivision is predominantly agrarian in the rural areas, with agriculture (paddy, potato, vegetables) forming the primary occupation for most rural households, as described in the District Census Handbook and district profiles. Tourism is a significant economic activity in Rajgir town and its surroundings owing to the area's historical, religious and archaeological importance; services connected to hospitality, retail and transport contribute to the urban economy of Rajgir. Detailed occupational and sectoral worker-class data are available in the Census DCHB worker tables and district economic profiles.

== Transport ==
Rajgir town is connected by road to other towns in Nalanda district and to Patna and Gaya via state highways and district roads; public and private bus services operate from Rajgir. The nearest major rail and road nodes are described in the district transport and the DCHB village/town directories (Part A), which list road connectivity and nearest railheads for each town and village. The DCHB and district portal give details of major roads, bus stands and transport facilities in the sub-division.

== Education and public services ==
Education and health infrastructure for Rajgir subdivision (numbers of primary/secondary schools, colleges, primary health centres, community health centres and hospitals) are recorded in the District Census Handbook (Part A — Village & Town Directory) and on the district administration portals (schools/hospitals directories). The DCHB lists the educational institutions and medical facilities in Rajgir town and in the villages of Rajgir CD Block; the district's official directories provide the current administrative contact points.

== See also ==
- Nalanda
- Rajgir
