= Kamal Nath Jha =

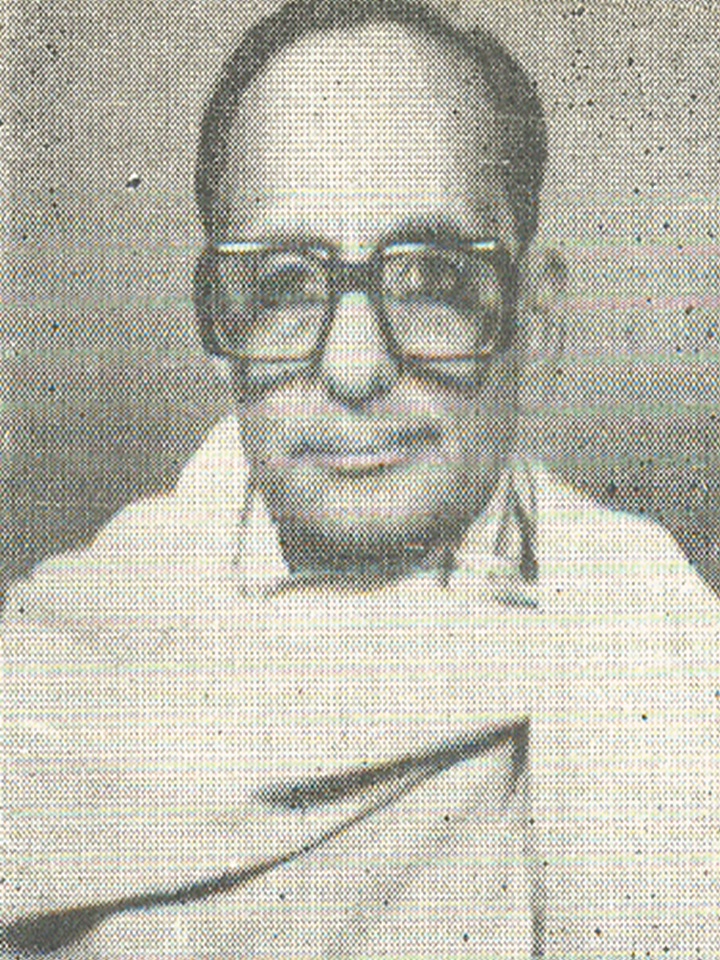
Image of Shri Kamal Nath Jha

Kamal Nath Jha (15 August 1923 - 11 February 2003 (aged 79) was a freedom fighter, social activist, Bihar state legislative assembly member, Rajya Sabha member and later an Indian National Congress Lok Sabha Member of Parliament from the Saharsa (Lok Sabha constituency).

== Early life ==
Kamal Nath Jha was the son of Pandit Bishwa Nath Jha and Janaki Devi. He was born at Bangaon village in Saharsa district. He received his early education at Kishanganj High School and T.N.J. College, Bhagalpur and married Usha Devi in 1940.

== Political career ==
=== Independence movement ===
Shri Kamal Nath Jha participated in the Indian independence movement. He was originally associated with the Socialist Party, offered Satyagraha, and courted arrest during college days for the same. He gave up his studies and joined the freedom movement in 1942. Being a natural leader, he organized the underground armed resistance force known as "Azad Dasta" in Purnea district - intended to merge with the Azad Hind Fauz once it entered India, which never happened. In the aftermath of the failure of Azad Hind Fauz to enter India, Jha destroyed arms worth crores of rupees in those days lest they fell into the hands of the British.

Soon thereafter he was trapped on the Koshi Bridge by British troops along with his comrades and shooting ensued. Despite being wounded and in high fever, Shri Jha jumped into the raging Koshi river. He was later arrested at a train station when he was trying to escape. His arrest was as a security prisoner under D.I.R. in 1944 and detained in Bhagalpur Central Jail and released in 1946 after the case against him- likely to yield death by hanging or kala pani (life imprisonment in the Andaman Islands) was inconclusive, Indian independence being nigh also played a role.

=== After independence ===
Shri Jha worked with Champaran Land Enquiry Commission 1950; organized and conducted Crop Shares movement and struggle in Purnea District and courted arrest thrice (over 1952-57). He was the secretary and member of All India Kisan Panchayat over the 1950s (1950–53). He was an active member of the Bihar Socialist Party during mid 1950s and set up the Mahila College in Purnea in 1970s, a venture that was the first of its kind in North Bihar. He was also a member, Senate, Bhagalpur University, 1964–65; President, Jute Mazdoor Panchayat 1957-67; and also President of a number of other Trade Unions. Jha was a member of Bihar Legislative Assembly, 1962–67; Member, Rajya Sabha, 1973–80; Member Lok Sabha 1980-84. He was the first member of the parliament to resign on the floor of the parliament in 1984 citing autocratic leadership in the ruling party (Congress (I)) that reached a crisis point with dismissal of the NTR government. India Today reported in those days when parliamentary debates were not shown live:'Kamal Nath Jha, Congress(I) MP from Bihar, literally crossed the floor even while the Lok Sabha was discussing Andhra Pradesh-"It is authoritarianism of the worst kind," said Jha.' His words came through to yield consequences that are well known in Indian polity for what happened in that seminal year of 1984.

He was renowned for this oratory powers that came to the fore when he was a freedom fighter. This gained appeal state-wide and later also on a national scale the three decades after independence. Shri Jha's public speeches in the days when media coverage was scant provided much acknowledged inspiration to many who became state and national level politicians over the years.

Given the drive of money and corruption in politics Shri Jha decided to retire from politics after losing a parliamentary election which was widely reported to be rigged against him given his stand against the Congress (I), and was the beginning of the end of sanity in Bihar state politics. He was approached in late 1980s to be part of the United Front that ousted the Congress government. He declined because he felt that there was a great likelihood to do more harm than good - given the new murky realities of political life in India then. More so, he believed that change called for a more grassroots approach than what parliamentary members managed to do or facilitate in those days. Shri Jha dedicated the rest of his life to supporting grassroots work. He died in 2003 after being on kidney dialysis for a year.

Shri Jha lost his mother very early and faced difficult, impoverished times in childhood to rise through sheer grit and determination, and with a passion for social justice. He encouraged and facilitated the rise of the status of landless and women in Bihar. He found blessings and support from an elderly freedom fighter when he was in jail, something he never forgot and did his duty as a son for him as well. Throughout his life he took inspiration from the faint images he had of his mother when he was up against barriers that seemed insurmountable. Shri Jha's wife Smt. Usha Devi helped him achieve his passion by looking after the family through impoverished and trying times. Though an illiterate she ensured that their children were well educated and stood steadfast not behind, but with her husband to define standards in virtue and honesty. They were survived by three daughters, two sons and many grandchildren.
