= Supaul =

- City
- Interactive map of Supaul
- Location in Bihar, India
- Coordinates: 26.126°N 86.605°E
- Country: India
- State: Bihar
- Region: Mithila
- SubRegion: Kosi
- District: Supaul
- Established: 1800

Government
  - Type: Municipality
  - Body: Supaul Municipal Council

Area
  - Total: 15 km^{2} (5.8 sq mi)
- Elevation: 33 m (108 ft)

Population (2011)
  - Total: 65,437
  - Density: 4,400/km^{2} (11,000/sq mi)
- Demonym: Maithil

Languages
  - Official: Hindi
  - Additional official: Maithili
  - Regional Language: Maithili
- Time zone: UTC+5:30 (IST)
- Postal code: 852131
- Vehicle registration: BR-50
- Lok Sabha constituency: Supaul
- Vidhan Sabha constituency: Supaul, Pipra, Triveniganj, Chhatapur, Nirmali
- Website: https://supaul.nic.in/

Supaul is a city and municipality that is headquarters of Supaul district in the Indian state of Bihar.

Supaul, previously part of Saharsa district, is part of the Mithila region.

== Geography ==
Supaul is located at 25.93°N 86.25°E. It has an average elevation of 34 metres (111 feet).

== History ==
Supaul has a good place. It was administratively Established before 1800. Before that it was a small town. It has been a part of Mithila (region) And Videha. Supaul has been referred as the fishery area (Matasya Kshetra) in the Hindu mythology in ancient times.

== Climate ==
Climate data for Supaul (1991–2020)
Month	Jan	Feb	Mar	Apr	May	Jun	Jul	Aug	Sep	Oct	Nov	Dec	Year
Record high °C (°F)	30.6 (87.1)	33.1 (91.6)	38.5 (101.3)	41.5 (106.7)	42.0 (107.6)	43.0 (109.4)	38.6 (101.5)	38.0 (100.4)	37.1 (98.8)	36.0 (96.8)	34.8 (94.6)	30.1 (86.2)	43.0 (109.4)
Mean daily maximum °C (°F)	21.0 (69.8)	26.6 (79.9)	31.5 (88.7)	34.4 (93.9)	34.4 (93.9)	34.2 (93.6)	32.9 (91.2)	33.1 (91.6)	32.9 (91.2)	32.2 (90.0)	29.7 (85.5)	24.3 (75.7)	30.9 (87.6)
Mean daily minimum °C (°F)	8.4 (47.1)	12.3 (54.1)	16.6 (61.9)	20.9 (69.6)	23.2 (73.8)	25.0 (77.0)	25.3 (77.5)	25.7 (78.3)	24.9 (76.8)	22.0 (71.6)	15.9 (60.6)	11.1 (52.0)	19.8 (67.6)
Record low °C (°F)	2.2 (36.0)	3.8 (38.8)	8.8 (47.8)	12.1 (53.8)	17.4 (63.3)	15.6 (60.1)	15.4 (59.7)	15.8 (60.4)	17.8 (64.0)	14.6 (58.3)	9.0 (48.2)	5.0 (41.0)	2.2 (36.0)
Source: India Meteorological Department

== Demographics ==
As of 2011 India census, Supaul had a population of 65,437 of which male were 34,421 and female were 31,016 respectively. The initial provisional data suggest a population of 65,437 in 2011 compared to 54,962 in 2001.

== Educational institutions ==
- Collage
  - SCE
  - Degree Collage
- Schools
  - Delhi Public School
  - Williams high school

== Notable people ==
- Anup Lal Yadav — politician
- Dileshwar Kamait — politician
- Govind Kumar Singh — fashion designer
- R. K. Singh, politician
- Randhir Prasad Verma — IPS & Ashok Chakra Awardee
- Ranjeet Ranjan — politician
- Syed Shahnawaz Hussain — politician
- Udit Narayan Jha — singer
