= Gunanand Thakur =

Indian politician

Member of Parliament, Rajya Sabha
- In office 1972–1978
- Constituency: Bihar

Member of Parliament, Lok Sabha
- In office 1967-1971
- Preceded by: Lahtan Choudhary
- Succeeded by: Chiranjib Jha
- Constituency: Saharsa, Bihar

Personal details
- Born: 19 February 1938 Baninia, Saharsa district, Bihar, British India
- Died: 28 September 1982 (aged 44)
- Party: Samyukta Socialist Party
- Other political affiliations: Praja Socialist Party, Indian National Congress
- Spouse: Shanti Devi
- Children: Suchita Jha, Sarita Jha, Sangeeta Jha, Nand Kishore, Raj Kishore

Gunanand Thakur was an Indian politician. He was a Member of Parliament, representing Saharsa, Bihar in the Lok Sabha the lower house of India's Parliament as a member of the Samyukta Socialist Party.
