= Kosi region =

Koshi Region
- Subregion
- Kosi Region
- Coordinates: 26.126°N 86.605°E
- Country: India Nepal
- State: Bihar
- Region: Mithila
- Largest cities: Saharsa,Itahari,Dharan and The Supaul
- Division and District: Kosi Division And Sunsari District
- Demonym: Maithil

Language
  - Language: Maithili and Thethi dialect

Kosi Region is a region in the Indian state of Bihar and Nepal's Sunsari District. The 4 districts in this region are Sunsari District, Saharsa District, Madhepura District and Supaul District. It consists of Kosi Division and Sunsari District. It is a subregion in Mithila.

Rank	Towns/ Cities	District	population
1.	Saharsa	Saharsa	216,491
2.	Dharan	Sunsari	173,096
3.	Itahari	Sunsari	198,098
4.	The Supaul	Supaul	65,437

== Name ==
The name of Kosi region comes from the Kosi River/Kausikim which flows through this region. The name Kosi comes from the ancient name Kausiki.

== Administration ==
Kosi Region has 4 districts:

- Supaul district
- Saharsa district
- Sunsari district
- Madhepura district

== History ==
Kosi Region became part of Mithila in ancient times. It was ruled by the Videha in Later Vedic period, kirata and many others. Hindu scriptures and mythological texts refer this region as Matasya kshetra.
