= Vishwa Mohan Kumar =

Indian politician (born 1958)

Vishwa Mohan Kumar (born 22 January 1958) is an Indian politician. He was a member of the Indian Parliament, and represented Supaul Lok Sabha constituency in 15th Lok Sabha.
