= Supaul district =

District in Bihar, India

Coordinates: 25.9300°N 86.2500°E

- District of Bihar
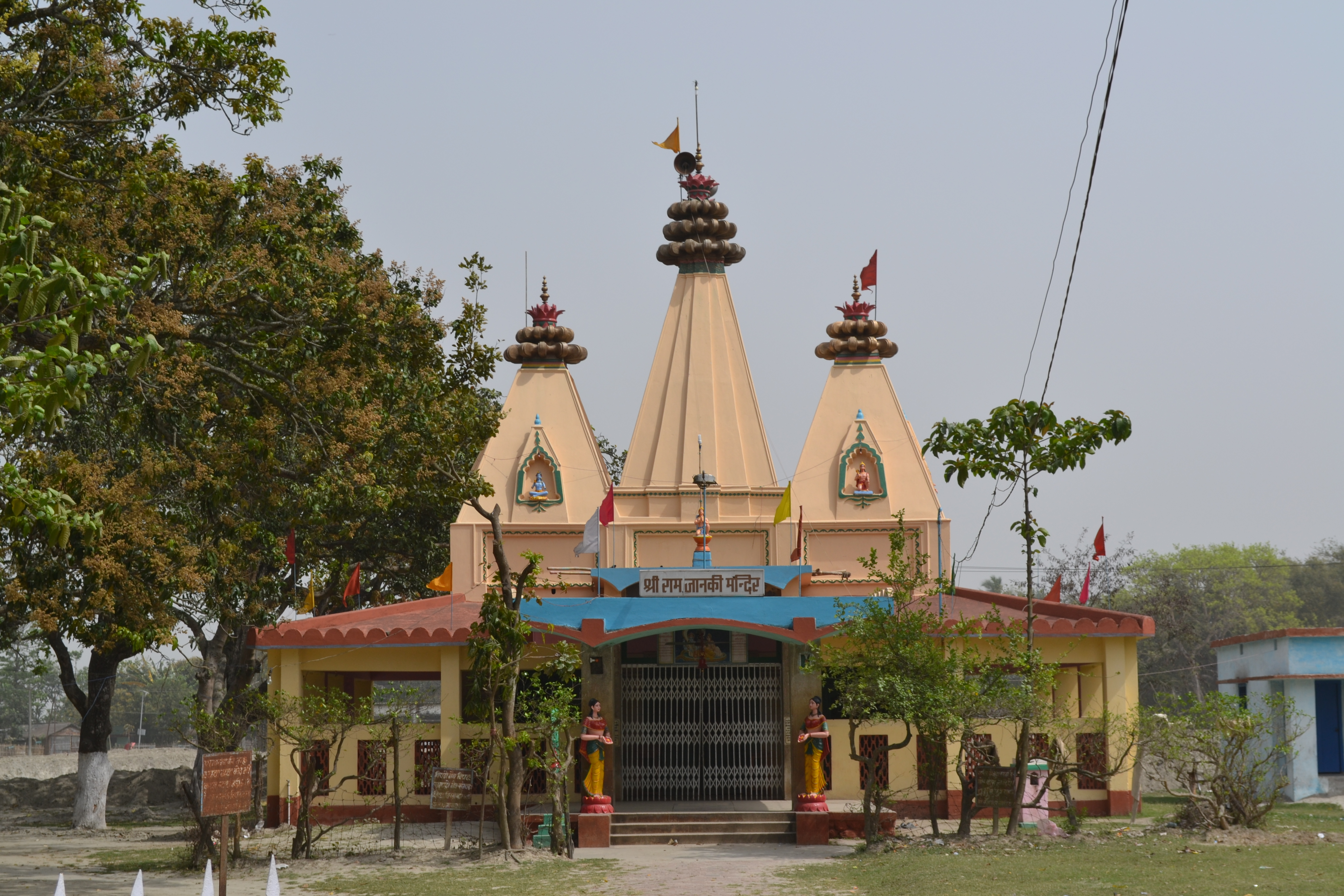
- Ram Janaki Mandir, Birpur

- Country: India
- State: Bihar
- Region: Mithila
- Division: Kosi
- SubRegion: Kosi
- Headquarters: Supaul

Government
  - Lok Sabha constituencies: Supaul
  - Vidhan Sabha constituencies: Nirmali, Pipra, Supaul, Triveniganj, Chhatapur

Area
  - Total: 2,410 km^{2} (930 sq mi)
- Elevation: 62 m (203 ft)

Population (2011)
  - Total: 2,229,076
  - Density: 925/km^{2} (2,400/sq mi)

Demographics
  - Literacy: 72.86 per cent
- Time zone: UTC+05:30 (IST)
- PIN: 8521xx (Supaul)
- Major highways: NH 57, NH 106, NH 107 NH 327E NH 327A SH 91 SH 76 Indo-Nepal border road
- Website: supaul.nic.in

Supaul district is one of the thirty-eight districts of Bihar, India. The town Supaul is the district's administrative headquarters. The district, which was split from the former Saharsa district on 14 March 1991, occupies 2,410 km^{2} (931 sq mi).

== History ==
Supaul is part of the Mithila region. Mithila first gained prominence after being settled by Indo-Aryan people, who established the Mithila Kingdom (also called Kingdom of the Videhas).

During the late Vedic period (c. 1100–500 BCE), Videha, along with Kuru and Pañcāla, became one of the major political and cultural centres of South Asia. The kings of the Videha Kingdom were called Janakas. The Videha Kingdom was later incorporated into the Vajjika League, which had its capital in the city Vaishali, which is also in Mithila.

Supaul district has been referred to as the fishery area (Matasya Kshetra) in Hindu mythology in ancient times. It was previously a part of Saharsa district.

== Geography ==
Supaul district occupies 2,425 km^{2} (936 sq mi) and is bounded by Nepal to the north, Araria district to the east, Madhepura and Saharsa districts to the south, and Madhubani district to the west. Supaul district is a part of Kosi division. The Kosi River flows through the district, which is regularly affected when it floods. Supaul district has an average elevation of 62 metres (203 ft) above sea level, with elevations ranging from 42 metres (138 ft) to 106 metres (348 ft).

== Notable people ==
- R. K. Singh, IAS is a former Indian bureaucrat served as Home Secretary to GoI and a member of the Indian Parliament since May 2014.
- Syed Shahnawaz Hussain, BJP spokesperson and former Union Minister is also from Supaul.
- Udit Narayan was born in the village of Baisi in the district of Supaul.
- Sharda Sinha, Indian folk singer
- Lalit Narayan Mishra, former politician and minister
- Jagannath Mishra, former Chief Minister of Bihar
- Govind Kumar Singh, a fashion designer

== Educational Institutions ==
- Bhupendra Narayan Mandal University
- Jamiatul Qasim Darul Uloom Al-Islamiah

== Sub-divisions ==
The Supaul district comprises the following four sub-divisions:

- Supaul Sadar
- Birpur
- Triveniganj
- Nirmali

=== Blocks ===
There are a total of eleven blocks in the Supaul District:

- Basantpur (Parts of Birpur Sub-division)
- Raghopur (Parts of Birpur Sub-division)
- Pratapganj (Parts of Birpur Sub-division)
- Supaul (Parts of Supaul Sadar Sub-division)
- Kishanpur (Parts of Supaul Sadar Sub-division)
- Saraigarh-Bhaptiyahi (Parts of Supaul Sadar Sub-division)
- Pipra (Parts of Supaul Sadar Sub-division)
- Triveniganj (Parts of Triveniganj Sub-division)
- Chhatapur (Parts of Triveniganj Sub-division)
- Nirmali (Parts of Nirmali Sub-division)
- Marauna (Parts of Nirmali Sub-division)

== Politics ==
Supaul Lok Sabha is one of the 40 Lok Sabha (parliamentary) constituencies in Bihar state. This constituency came into existence in 2008 as a part of the implementation of delimitation of parliamentary constituencies based on the recommendations of the Delimitation Commission of India constituted in 2002.

District	No.	Constituency	Name	Party	Alliance	Remarks
Supaul	41	Nirmali	Aniruddha Prasad Yadav	JD(U)	NDA	
Supaul	42	Pipra	Rambilash Kamat	JD(U)	NDA	
Supaul	43	Supaul	Bijendra Prasad Yadav	JD(U)	NDA	Deputy Chief Minister (Since 15 April 2026)
Supaul	44	Triveniganj (SC)	Sonam Rani Sardar	JD(U)	NDA	
Supaul	45	Chhatapur	Neeraj Kumar Singh	BJP	NDA	

== Economy ==
Agriculture is the major occupation of this district and rice is the main crop.

In 2006, the Ministry of Panchayati Raj named Supaul as one of the country's 250 most backward districts out of a total of 640. It is one of the 36 districts in Bihar that receive funds from the Backward Regions Grant Fund Programme (BRGF). From December 2012, Bivha International Child Fund has funded education in Supaul's Koshi division. Several programs are funded for education, agriculture from Bivha International School, Bivha Rural Development fund, national banks, NABARD, and World Bank.

A dairy farm, which produce approximately 100,000 litres (22,000 imp gal) of milk per day has been established by Bivha Corporation in Simrahi Bazar, Supaul. There is also an egg farm, which produces approximately 20,000 eggs per day, which was established by M/S Koshi in Parsauni village.

== Demographics ==
Historical population
Year	Pop.	±% p.a.
1901	350,636	—
1911	361,484	+0.31%
1921	349,040	−0.35%
1931	369,329	+0.57%
1941	372,219	+0.08%
1951	431,547	+1.49%
1961	663,339	+4.39%
1971	854,589	+2.57%
1981	1,087,762	+2.44%
1991	1,342,841	+2.13%
2001	1,732,578	+2.58%
2011	2,229,076	+2.55%

Religions in Supaul district (2011)
Religion	Percent
Hinduism	81.20%
Islam	18.36%
Other or not stated	0.44%

According to the 2011 census, Supaul district had a population of 2,229,076, roughly equal to the nation Latvia or the US state of New Mexico. This gives it a ranking of 204th in India (out of a total of 640) districts. The district has a population density of 919 inhabitants per square kilometre (2,380/sq mi). Its population growth rate over the decade 2001–2011 was 28.62%. Supaul has a sex ratio of 925 females for every 1000 males and a literacy rate of 59.65%. 4.74% of the population lives in urban areas. Scheduled Castes and Scheduled Tribes make up 15.89% and 0.46% of the population respectively.

Languages of Supaul district (2011)
1. Maithili (76.3%)
2. Hindi (12.4%)
3. Urdu (9.30%)
4. Bengali (1.25%)
5. Others (0.71%)

At the time of the 2011 Census of India, 76.31% of the population in the district spoke Maithili, 12.43% Hindi, 9.30% Urdu and 1.25% Bengali as their first language.

=== Urban and Rural Supaul ===
==== Supaul District urban population 2011 ====
According to the 2011 census, out of the total population of Supaul, 4.74 percent live in urban regions of the district. In total, 105,558 people lives in urban areas; there were 55,788 males and 49,770 females. The sex ratio in the urban region of Supaul district is 1,000 males to 892 females as per 2011 census data. The sex ratio of children in Supaul district was 1,000 males to 932 females in 2011. The child population (ages 0–6) in urban region was 17,654, of which there were 9,140 males and 8,514 females, comprising 16.38% of the urban population. The average literacy rate in Supaul district as per census 2011 was 72.74%; the rate in males was 80.78% and in females it was 63.64%. The exact figure of 63,939 people in the urban regions were literate, of which males numbered 37,684 and females numbered 26,255.

==== Supaul District rural population 2011 ====
As per 2011 census, 2,123,518 people, 95.26% of the population of Supaul district, live in rural areas and villages. of which 1,099,495 were male and 1,024,023 were female. In rural areas of the district, the sex ratio is 931 females per 1,000 males. If the sex ratio of children is 945 girls per 1,000 boys. The child population of six years or below was 419,703 in rural areas, of which 215,813 were male and 203,890 were female. Children comprise 19.63% of the district's rural population. The literacy rate in rural areas of Supaul district is 56.89% as per census data 2011. Male and female literacy stood at 69.03& and 43.82% respectively. In total, 969,344 people were literate, of which 609,988 were male and 359,356 were female respectively.

== Culture ==
The well-known historical and religious place, namely Durga Sthan, parsarma lies in the Supaul district and it is only 10 km (6 mi) away from the district headquarters.

- Rajbiraj (10 km towards north in Nepal, is a historic city which houses the famous 8th century Rajdevi Temple and close to Chinnamasta shakti Peeth. It also has lot of displays of the region's culture. It is just off the Kunauli border.

Vishnu Mandir, temple based on south Indian architecture and dedicated to lord Vishnu has become a major tourist destination in the district. This adds a south Indian essence to the Mithila culture of the area. It is situated on the national highway 106.

== Transport ==
Supaul is well-connected to other cities by road with national highways 106 and 57 that pass through it. NH57 connects Supaul to major cities such as Silchar, Gauhati Siliguri, Forbesganj, Mujjafarpur, Gorakhpur, Lucknow, Ahmedabad and Porbandar. There are regular buses to the state's capital Patna and the national capital Delhi.

Rail transport is available across the district. The former narrow-gauge railway connecting to Saharsa and Forbesganj is running . It is planned to be connected to Forbesganj, Saharasa Darbhanga, Mujjafarpur, and numerous other cities.

- The former Prime Minister of India Atal Bihari Vajpayee prompted the foundation of New Kosi Mahasetu Bridge in 2002, which was washed away in heavy floods and the India-Nepal earthquake in 1934. The new bridge was inaugurated in 2020 by Narendra Modi and was constructed at a cost of ₹516 crore. The length of the bridge is 1.9 km (1.2 miles). Forbesganj, Saharasa and Raghopur - Saraigarh DEMU became first trains to cross this bridge.

== See also ==
- Sukhpur Dayodhi
