= Sasaram subdivision =

Administrative subdivision in Rohtas district, Bihar, India

- Subdivision
- Location in Bihar, India Sasaram subdivision (India)
- Coordinates: 24.9538118°N 84.0105649°E
- Country: India
- State: Bihar
- District: Rohtas
- Headquarters: Sasaram

Area
  - Total: 289.00 km^{2} (111.58 sq mi)

Population (2011)
  - Total: 358,283
  - Density: 1,239.7/km^{2} (3,210.9/sq mi)

Languages
  - Official: Hindi, Urdu (official); commonly Bhojpuri
- Time zone: UTC+5:30 (IST)
- PIN: 821115
- Vehicle registration: BR-24

Sasaram subdivision is an administrative subdivision in Rohtas district of the Indian state of Bihar. The subdivision's administrative headquarters is the town of Sasaram, and it comprises six Community Development (CD) Blocks, forming one of the three subdivisions of Rohtas district.

== Geography ==
Sasaram subdivision is located in the central–southern part of Rohtas district at approximately 24°57′N 84°00′E. It forms part of the broad Sasaram plain, lying on the northern edge of the Rohtas plateau. The terrain is predominantly flat to gently undulating agricultural land with occasional rocky outcrops extending from the plateau. The subdivision is drained by tributaries of the Son river system, as well as smaller seasonal streams. Certain low-lying areas are prone to seasonal flooding during the monsoon, as noted in district-level hydrographic and disaster management reports.

== Administration ==
Sasaram subdivision is one of three sub-divisions in Rohtas district and is administered from Sasaram. It consists of the following Community Development Blocks:

- Sasaram
- Shivsagar
- Chenari
- Kargahar
- Kochas
- Nokha

== Demographics ==
According to the 2011 Census, Sasaram subdivision had a total population of 358,283. The urban population is concentrated in Sasaram town (Nagar Parishad), while the remainder is distributed across rural areas. The subdivision exhibits literacy, sex ratio, and Scheduled Caste/Scheduled Tribe statistics consistent with district averages, as recorded in the District Census Handbook (Part B, PCA).

== Economy ==
The economy of Sasaram subdivision is predominantly agricultural. The majority of rural residents work as cultivators or agricultural labourers. Markets, periodic haats, agricultural mandi points, and small-scale or household industries are distributed across the subdivision, as detailed in the Village and Town Directories of the DCHB.

== Transport ==
Sasaram subdivision is accessible by road and rail. National and state highways connect Sasaram and its blocks to other parts of Rohtas district and neighboring districts. The town is also served by the Sasaram railway station, which provides regional train connectivity. Details on roads and transport facilities are provided in the DCHB and district portal.

== Education and public services ==
Educational and health facilities include government and private schools, higher-secondary institutions, degree and technical colleges, primary health centres (PHCs), community health centres (CHCs), and sub-centres. Sasaram town serves as the main hub for higher education and district-level public services. Details are available in the DCHB and on the district's official website.

== See also ==
- Bihar
- Rohtas district
- Sasaram
- Shivsagar
- Chenari
- Kargahar
- Kochas
- Nokha
