= Dawath =

Dawath Dāwath
- Village
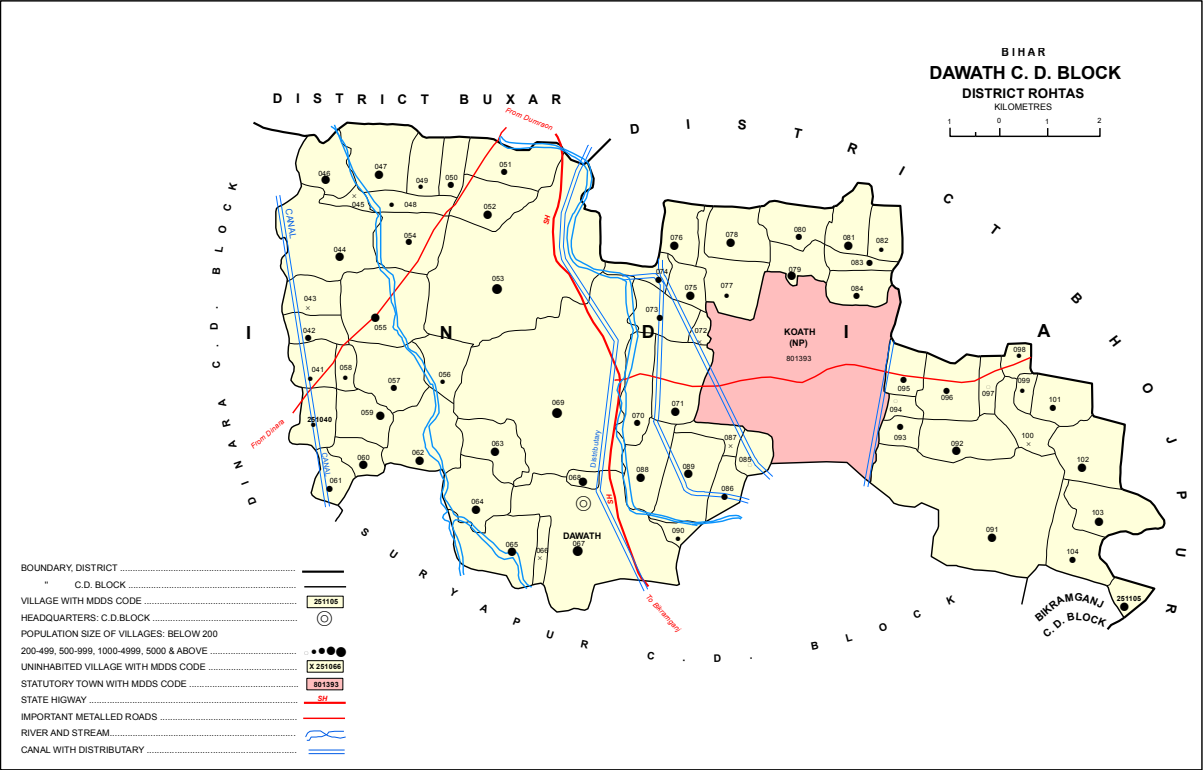

- Location in Bihar, India
- Coordinates: 25.29766°N 84.22447°E
- Country: India
- State: Bihar
- District: Rohtas

Area
  - Total: 5.74 km^{2} (2.22 sq mi)
- Elevation: 87 m (285 ft)

Population (2011)
  - Total: 5,372
  - Density: 936/km^{2} (2,420/sq mi)

Languages
  - Official: Hindi
- Time zone: UTC+5:30 (IST)
- PIN: 802226

Dawath is a village and corresponding community development block in Rohtas district of Bihar state, India. The nearest city is the nagar panchayat town of Koath, which is administered as part of Dawath block.

As of 2011, the population of Dawath was 5,372, in 828 households. The entire block had a population of 108,455.

== Geography ==
The entirety of Dawath block lies on the Sasaram Plain.

== Demographics ==
Historical population
Year	Pop.	±%
2001	92,987	—
2011	108,455	+16.6%
Source: 2011 Census of India

In 2011, the sex ratio of Dawath block was 944, above the district average of 921. The sex ratio was higher in the 0-6 age group at 958, which was the highest in Rohtas. Scheduled castes made up 16.41% of the block population and members of scheduled tribes made up 0.16%. The literacy rate of Dawath block was 71.13%, slightly below the Rohtas district rate of 73.37$%. There was a 22.93% gap in literacy between men and women, with 82.22% of men but only 59.29% of women able to read and write.

== Amenities ==
As of 2011, Dawath village did not have tap water; drinking water was instead provided by well and hand pump. It had permanent pucca roads connected to both national and state highways. There was a community centre, a public library, and sports fields. The town had access to electrical power.

== Villages ==
There are 66 villages in Dawath block, including Dawath itself. Of these, 60 are inhabited and 6 are uninhabited.

Village name	Total land area (hectares)	Population (in 2011)
Bairia	94.7	320
Bithni	75.7	447
Choranti	92.3	719
Kharanti	60.3	0
Anwarhi	318.9	2,601
Narayanpur	44.9	0
Damdiha	97	1,135
Akorha	163.1	1,027
Dharkanha Khurd	101.6	346
Harakhmal Dehri	66.8	425
Patkhauli	53.8	620
Parsiyakhurd	140.1	815
Parsiya Kalen	144.9	1,630
Semri	836.8	11,204
Dharkanha Kalan	148.6	692
Jamsona	265.1	2,448
Rajaundha	95.1	293
Pararia	144.9	903
Kamdhanwan	31.2	205
Chhitni	106.3	1,355
Chatra	64	1,384
Doma Dehri	69	549
Dewrhi	220	1,412
Mahuari	135.3	1,741
Sahinaon	145.3	1,555
Bodarhi	191.2	2,167
Pasram Patti Dalia	28.65	0
Dawath (block headquarters)	547	5,372
Bithwa	22.3	2,961
Babhanaul	957.4	9,120
Dolaicha	130	805
Dewgana	155	1,441
Tendobahar	28	0
Bhundadih	114.1	647
Batsa	79	814
Shahpur	65.6	1,331
Param Dehri	85.4	1,283
Khairahi	155.8	491
Bahuara	112.1	1,494
Itwa	102	1,813
Babhani	0	939
Jagadhara	95.6	1,153
Hamir Dehri	102.8	492
Bairiya	61.9	747
Jharkaria	59.1	556
Ahir Chaunri	662.1	191
Chaunri Kedar	59.1	883
Madhubana	74.4	0
Sundar	51.1	1,082
Usari	136.4	1,830
Saadat Dehra	193	238
Derhgaon	82.1	4,865
Gidha	674.6	2,903
Bodh Chatar	178.8	609
Harna Chatar	57.9	141
Chak Chatar	28.3	800
Naktauli	67.6	940
Bhatauli	131.1	26
Gopal Dehri	40	296
Madhopur	30	218
Sughari	108.46	0
Parmanpur	108.9	910
Hathdihan	174.8	2,254
Ramnagar	178.9	2,104
Tilakpura	123	820
Katailbal	57.1	1,003
