= Akorhi Gola =

Akorhi Gola Akorhīgola
- Village
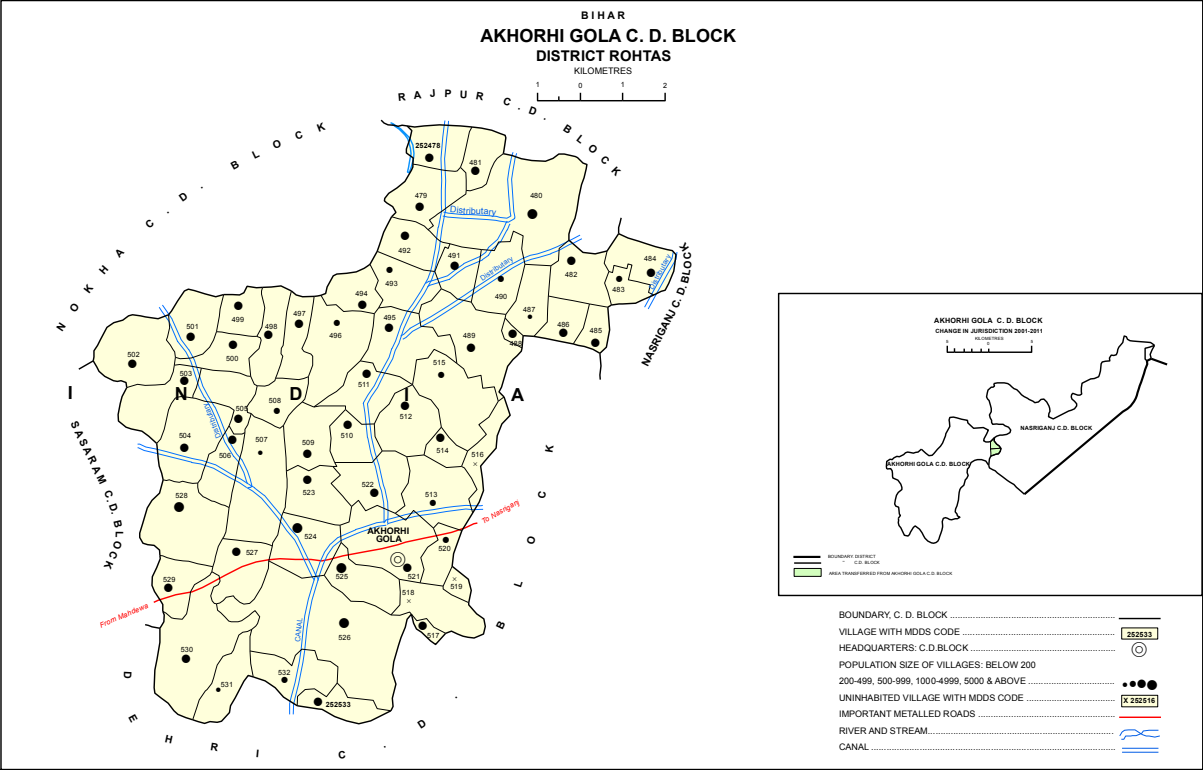

- Location in Bihar, India
- Coordinates: 24.97128°N 84.19056°E
- Country: India
- State: Bihar
- District: Rohtas

Area
  - Total: 2.52 km^{2} (0.97 sq mi)
- Elevation: 110 m (360 ft)

Population (2011)
  - Total: 3,810
  - Density: 1,510/km^{2} (3,920/sq mi)

Languages
  - Official: Hindi
- Time zone: UTC+5:30 (IST)

Akorhi Gola is a village and corresponding community development block in Rohtas district of Bihar, India. Located 6 km north of Dehri, Akorhi Gola is known for its blanket weaving industry. As of 2011, the village had a population of 3,810, in 601 households, while the total block population was 120,145.

== Demographics ==
Akorhi Gola is an entirely rural block, with no major urban centres. Its population increased from 98,613 in 2001 to 120,145 in 2011, representing a 21.8% increase. The sex ratio of the block is 918 females to every 1000 males, which is slightly below the district average of 921 for rural areas. In 2011, the sex ratio was higher among the 0–6 age group, with 932 females for every 1000 males, which was about equal to the district average of 931. Members of scheduled castes numbered 27,952, making up 23.27% of the block population, and members of scheduled tribes numbered 69, or 0.06% of the population.

Of the 3,180 residents of Akorhi Gola village in 2011, 53.20% (2,027) were male and 46.80% (1,783) were female. 14.04% (535 people) were in the 0–6 age group. The literacy rate of the village was 64.23% (73.56% among men and 53.62% among women). There were 1,499 total workers in the village, of whom 1,116 were male and 383 were female. There were 177 (127 male and 50 female) cultivators who owned or leased their own land, 793 (593 male and 200 female) agricultural labourers who worked someone else's land for wages, 56 (40 male and 16 female) household industry workers, and 648 (431 male and 217 female) other workers.

=== Literacy ===
In 2011, the literacy rate of Akorhi Gola block was 72.33%, slightly below the district rate of 73.37%. Literacy was higher in men than in women: 83.13% of men, but only 60.54% of women, could read and write; the corresponding 22.59% literacy gap was slightly higher than the district average of 19.91%.

== Amenities ==
=== Akorhi Gola village ===
Akorhi Gola does not have tap water, with drinking water instead coming from either well or hand pump. It has public toilets, telephone coverage, or Internet access. Now It has permanent pucca roads. It has four Banks (SBI, PNB, HDFC, MGB), a post office, a public library, many recreation centre with sports fields, and a daily mandi, but not a weekly haat or any movie theatres. It has one primary school and three middle schools and also secondary schools(Senior Secondary School Premnagar); there is one medical facility.

=== Akorhi Gola block ===
All villages in Akorhi Gola block have access to electricity, a distinction it shares with Dehri block in Rohtas district. 48 of the 53 inhabited villages have schools, serving 92.5% of the population, which is marginally above the average for Rohtas district. 12 villages have medical facilities, serving 36.43% of the population, which again is slightly above the district average. 35 villages have telephone services, serving 63.75% of the population. 13 villages have banks and agricultural credit societies, serving 52.69% of the population, and 44 have access to permanent pucca roads, serving 85.34% of the block population.

In 2011, 53.08% of Akorhi Gola block's residents lived in permanent pucca houses, 28.89% lived in semi-permanent houses, and 17.91% lived in temporary kutcha houses. A large majority (94.63%) of households used mainly hand pump for access to drinking water, with 3.01% using tap water and the remainder using wells and other sources. 73.4% of households used kerosene lamps for lighting, with 24.15% using electric lights and the remainder using other sources. Most households did not have toilets, with 1.05% using mainly public toilets and 79.36% using open defecation. 1.14% had toilets connected to sanitary sewers, 14.67% had toilets connected to septic tanks, and 1.65% had flush toilets connected to other systems. For fuel used in cooking, a majority of households (65.99%) used mainly cow dung cakes, with 17.43% using firewood and 8.86% using crop residue (the remainder used other fuels). Most households (76.52%) did not have kitchens in the home; 17.18% did have kitchens in their homes, while the remainder cooked outdoors. 60.34% of households had access to banking services.

In addition, 26.47% of households had radios, 21.05% had televisions, 0.59% had computers with internet access and 4.96% had computers without internet. 2.19% had landline telephones, 60.98% had cell phones, and 1.1% had both types of phone. 66.67% had bicycles, 9.69% had motor scooters, motorcycles, or mopeds, and 1.55% had automobiles. 16.89% did not have any of the above items.

== Villages ==
Akorhi Gola block comprises 56 villages, 53 inhabited and 3 uninhabited:

Village name	Total land area (hectares)	Population (in 2011)
Habbupur	141.7	1,247
Kapasia	202	1,681
Balgawan	637.3	5,162
Tendubahar	107.6	1,163
Haundih	157	1,306
Hamiradih	70	716
Sarawan	135.6	1,316
Birodih	65.6	1,178
Chhotki Biseni	94.74	2,364
Karmahi	93.9	397
Ghorahi	23.9	0
Kaithi	274.7	2,748
Biseni Kalan	170.8	2,982
Karup	98.2	892
Niman	123.1	1,010
Kusmhara	160.3	1,355
Chit Bisawan	110	901
Tetrarh	248.1	3,630
Bagha Khoh	265.4	2,742
Jadwa	114.6	994
Bandhpa	136.4	1,442
Isra	92.7	1,495
Piarepur	128.7	1,444
Chanp	172.4	1,413
Budhua	257.7	2,907
Mahuari	175.2	1,389
Pakaria	263.4	3,136
Salea	122.7	1,620
Khapra	123.9	1,627
Chhapra	323.4	3,928
Basantpur	125	496
Chanda	185.3	939
Gamharia	121.8	2,335
Nawadih	167.9	2,100
Munriar	185.7	3,343
Barka Tenua	220	1,683
Tenua Khurd	69.7	671
Kaupa	232	1,736
Tewari Dih	80.2	578
Sahji	32.8	0
Dharahara	178.9	3,834
Chhemuan	36.68	0
Sherpur	102.4	754
Akorhi (capital)	292	3,810
Baruna	179.3	4,231
Karkatpur	153.7	1,511
Bararhi	196.6	7,394
Madhurampur Dehri	149	5,249
Bank	770.9	10,444
Zorawarpur	178.8	1,279
Chandi	309.6	5,441
Bagen	129.6	1,306
Gobardhanpur	405.1	3,699
Bahoranpur	143.3	493
Ugra	174	945
Mathurapur	78.52	1,689
