= Bardihan =

Village in India

Coordinates: 26.349498°N 83.853203°E

Bardihan is a village in Nasriganj block of the Rohtas district of Bihar.

It was also known as Chawni (cant.), as during British rule.
