= Titho =

Village in south-west Bihar, India

Coordinates: 25°07′N 84°17′E

Titho is a small village on the bank of a canal in Rohtas district of Bihar state in east India. it has a population of around 1500. This village is near other villages, Dhawani, Chilha, Gamhariya, Karma. Gamahariya is a panchayat of this village.
