= Mahuari =

- Interactive map of Mahuari

Mahuari is a village in Akorhi Gola in Pakidya Pancahyat in the Rohtas district of the Indian state of Bihar. Most of the inhabitants belong to the Brahmin and Yadav castes. It has a temple of the Goddess Durga and Khadeswari Maharaj.

== Demographics ==
Around 211 families live there.

According to the 2011 census, Mahuari village has a population of 1,348, of which 685 are males and 663 are females, with 265 children aged 0-6, accounting for 19.66% of the total. The average sex-ratio of Mahuari village is 968, which is lower than the Bihar state average of 918, while the child sex-ratio is 1,008, which is higher than the Bihar average of 935.

The literacy rate in Mahauri was 60.3% in 2011, compared to 61.80% in Bihar, with male literacy rates at 75.05% and female literacy rates at 44.91%.

== Geography ==
Neighbouring villages include Chanp, Bhaisahi, Lilari, Majhiyawan, Bishunpur, Khapra, Saleya, Bhav, Pachapokari, and Gamharia.

== Governance ==
Mahuari village is administered by an elected representative known as Sarpanch (Head of Village).

== Facilities ==
The village markets are Akorhi Gola, Dehri and Sasaram.

The village has one primary school.

== Economy ==
The major crops grown include: paddy, wheat, sugarcane, grams, and lentils (such as masoor dal).
