= Barkagaon Rakasiya =

Village in Bihar, India

Barkagaon Rakasiya is a village in Rohtas district, which is a part of Bihar State, India.
