= Tilouthu =

- Town
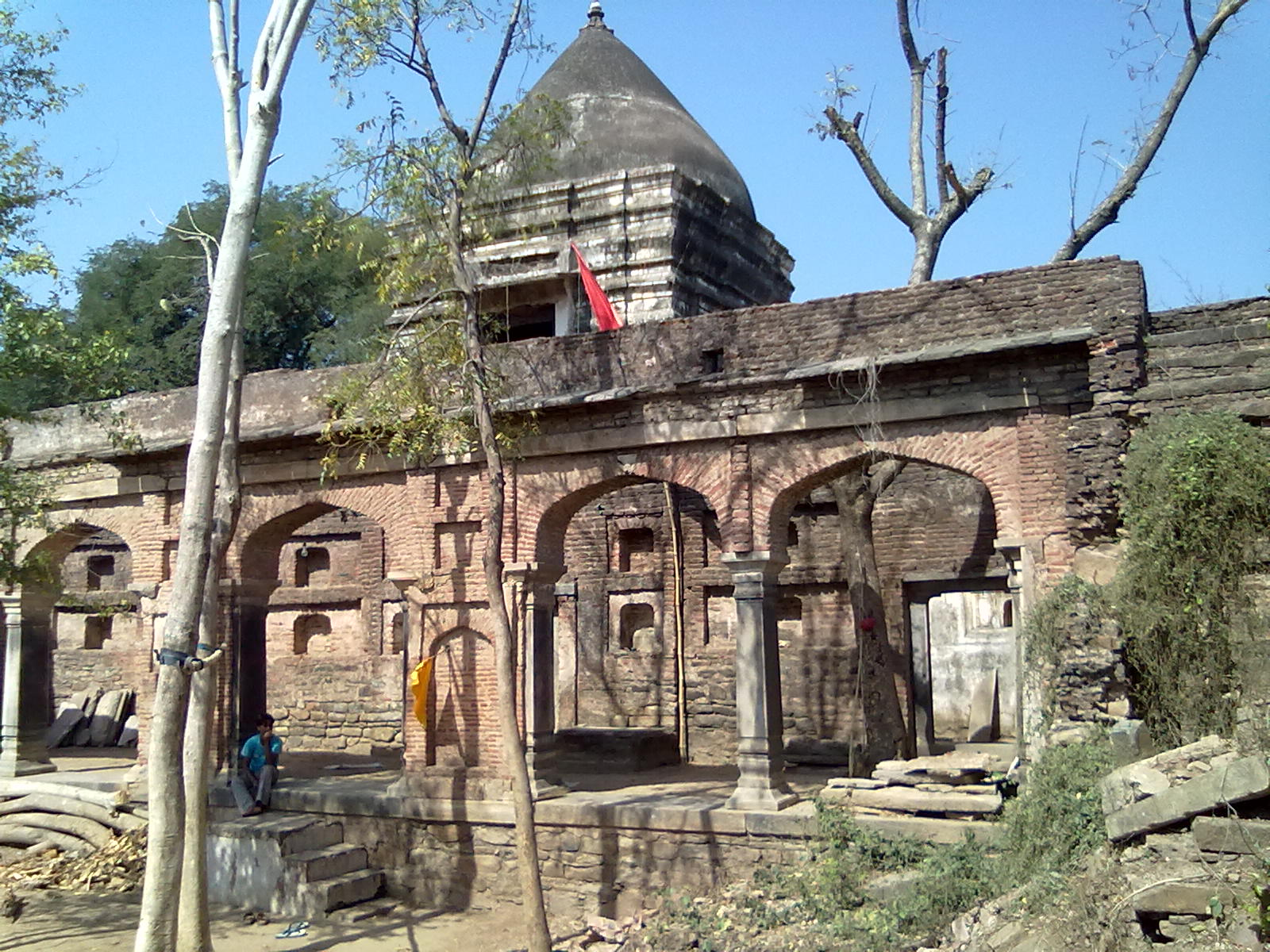
- Ancient Radhe Krishna Temple (Akhada Temple)

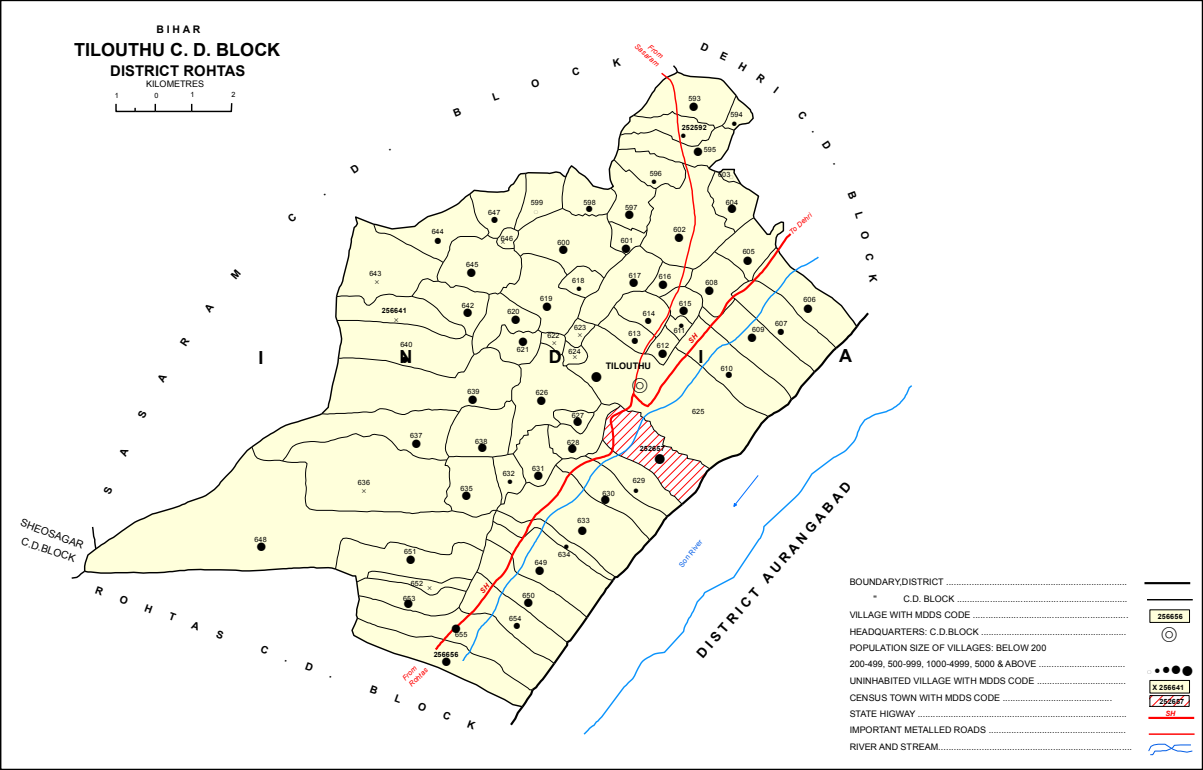

- Location in Bihar, India
- Coordinates: 24.80505°N 84.08331°E
- Country: India
- State: Bihar
- District: Rohtas
- Division: Patna

Area
  - Total: 9.583 km^{2} (3.700 sq mi)
- Elevation: 119 m (390 ft)

Population (2011)
  - Total: 16,402
  - Density: 1,712/km^{2} (4,433/sq mi)

Languages
  - Official: Hindi and Urdu
  - Common: Bhojpuri
- Time zone: UTC+5:30 (IST)
- PIN: 821312
- Nearest city: Dehri
- Literacy: 95%
- Lok Sabha constituency: Sasaram
- Vidhan Sabha constituency: Sasaram
- Website: rohtas.nic.in

Tilothu, also spelled Tilauthu or Tilothu, is a village and corresponding community development block in Rohtas district, Bihar, India. It is located 15 km from Dehri-on-Sone on the west bank of the Son River. As of 2011, the population of Tilouthu was 16,402, in 2,745 families, while the corresponding block population was 109,249.

The census town of Saraiya is located within Tilouthu block, immediately south of the village of Tilouthu. Kaimur pahari stands erect in the west of the city whereas the River Sone flows in the east.

Tilothu cattle fair is considered to be the largest cattle fair in the state.

== History ==
This city was named after Lord Tileshwarnath, a form of Lord Shiva. It was ruled over by Surwar rajputs (Guar clan) before independence. After this, Tilothu was ruled by the Kayastha king due to British reference.

The Radhe Krishna temple is more than 350 years old. It is situated on the holy bank of the river Sone.

== Demographics ==
Tilouthu block is a primarily rural district, apart from the urban town of Saraiya. The block population increased from 90,210 in 2001 to 109,249 in 2011, with 8,260 urban and 100,989 rural.

=== Sex ratio ===
The sex ratio of Tilouthu block was 911 in 2011: 913 in rural areas and 885 in urban ones. These were all somewhat lower than the district averages. In rural areas, the ratio was higher among the 0-6 age group at 935, which was slightly above the district rural average of 933, while the urban 0-6 ratio was lower at 870, lowest among urban areas in Rohtas district. The overall sex ratio for the block among the 0-6 age group was 930, compared to the district average of 930.

=== Literacy ===
The literacy rate of Tilouthu block was 70.99% in 2011, which was slightly below the district average of 73.37%. Literacy was higher in rural areas (71.21%) than urban ones (68.37%). Literacy was also higher among men than women, with 80.77% of men but only 60.18% of women able to read and write. The corresponding 20.55% gender literacy gap was slightly above average (19.91%) for Rohtas district.

== Amenities ==
37 of the 57 villages in Tilouthu block have medical facilities, serving 81.98% of the population, the highest proportion among sub-districts in Rohtas. 28 villages have telephone service, serving 68.84% of the population, 45 have permanent pucca roads, and 51 have access to electricity, serving 97.16% of the population. 9 villages have banks and agricultural credit societies, serving 45.84% of the block's population.

=== Education ===
The village of Tilauthu contains 6 pre-primary schools, 5 primary schools, 2 middle schools, and 1 secondary school.

For primary education, a lot of government supported and private schools are there, where one can get education in Hindi medium as well as English. A few of the famous schools are Sarswati Shishu Mandir, Amaltas Niketan and Tilouthu High School. For higher education, there is one undergrad college, Radha Shanta College. Nearest villages Babuganj, Saraiya, Mirasarai, Maharajganj, etc.

At the block level, 44 of the 57 inhabited villages have schools, serving 95.08% of the population.

== Villages ==
There are a total of 65 villages in Tilouthu block, 57 inhabited and 8 uninhabited:

Village name	Total land area (hectares)	Population (in 2011)
Maheshdih	156.3	430
Lewara	229.1	1,413
Dubauli	51	254
Kusdihra	165.1	1,873
Koidih	126.3	444
Ramdihra	158.2	1,950
Barkhoha	116.6	812
Margohi	127	58
Sewahi	358.2	3,377
Bardiha	59.4	1,104
Hurka	422.1	3,145
Dattauli	8.1	16
Dehri	123	1,516
Jamuhara	151.7	1,769
Indarpura	263.9	1,924
Madhanian	250.1	695
Jainagra	178.4	1,186
Jaraha	286.2	1,111
Mira Sarae	336.4	821
Seua	30.3	334
Sonaura	57.1	1,170
Alinagar	87	860
Pathara	100	741
Baradih	75.3	1,072
Harnachiti	81.3	1,156
Patluka	204.4	2,102
Mitarsenpur	69.2	440
Mirzapur	279.6	2,200
Chorkap	123	1,158
Bahera	110.19	1,061
Tilauthu Arazi	34.4	0
Chemni Chak	31	0
Dharampur	28	0
Tilauthu (capital)	958.3	16,402
Malpura	344.6	4,392
Rakian Bigha	51	1,151
Amra	136.4	1,089
Bhadsa	183.84	397
Panraria	224.86	1,135
Basdiha	144.4	1,549
Uchaila	69.7	462
Kerpa	504.7	3,973
Pirna Bigha	81	214
Supa Sarae	215.62	2,938
Rampur	768	0
Renria	395.32	1,233
Bhisra	229.4	1,146
Chanpura	634.3	4,310
Sonpura	374.3	635
Dighi	203.1	0
Kaithi	167.6	1,924
Belwai	400.7	0
Shiupur	214	759
Bhadokhra	274.8	4,256
Jhajhara	19.1	0
Saina	155	812
Churesar	1,626.8	1,631
Baulia	350.4	1,028
Jago Dih	273.6	1,789
Ramdihra	304.7	4,671
Panti	80	0
Rupahtha	182.94	1,551
Bishunpura	227.24	591
Chitauli	446.08	2,736
Ranjit Ganj	221.47	2,023
