= Nauhatta, Rohtas =

Nauhatta
- Village
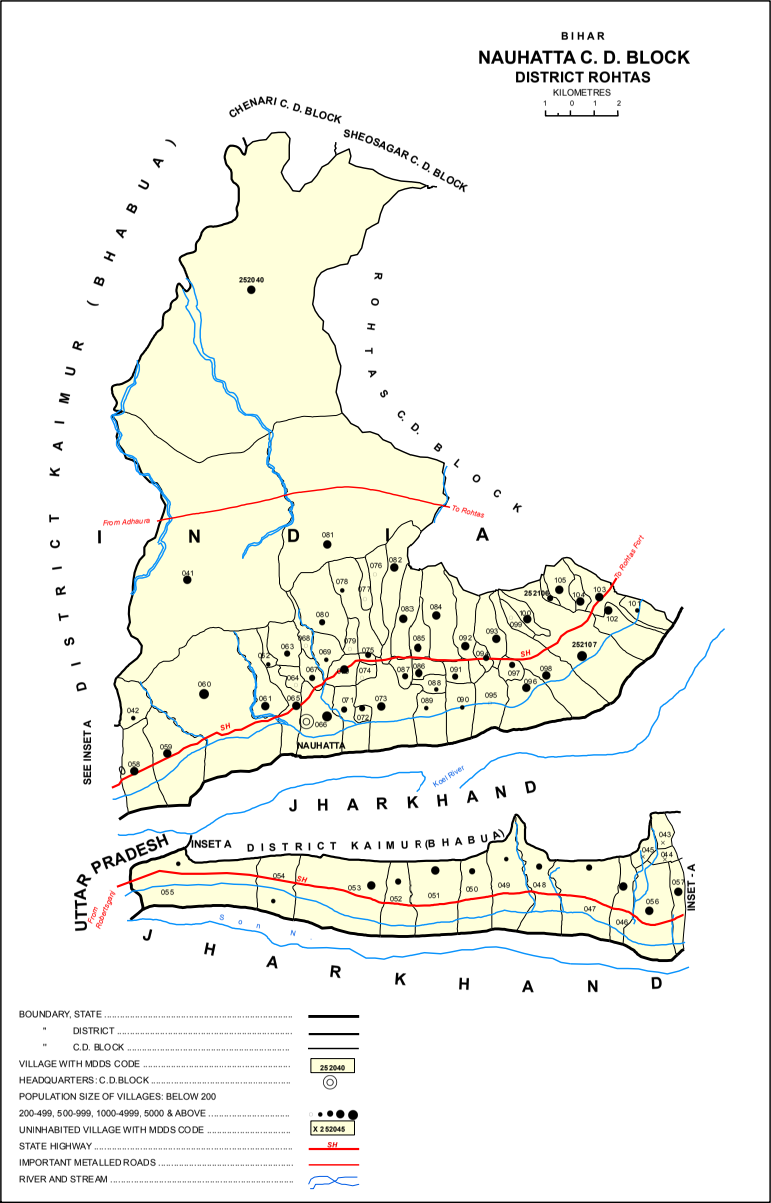

- Location in Bihar, India
- Coordinates: 24.5504°N 83.8116°E
- Country: India
- State: Bihar
- District: Rohtas

Area
  - Total: 4.97 km^{2} (1.92 sq mi)

Population (2011)
  - Total: 5,103
  - Density: 1,030/km^{2} (2,660/sq mi)

Languages
  - Official: Hindi
- Time zone: UTC+5:30 (IST)

Nauhatta is a village and corresponding community development block in Rohtas district of Bihar, India. As of 2011, the village of Nauhatta had a population of 5,103, in 909 households, while Nauhatta block had a population of 94,065, in 16,387 households. The nearest city is Dehri.

== Geography ==
Parts of Nauhatta block are located on the Rohtas plateau. There is no irrigation system in place in Nauhatta block; many parts of the block are hilly and unsuitable for irrigation. The area of Nauhatta block is 39,494 hectares, including 10,402.4 hectares of forest, while the area of Nauhatta village is 497 hectares.

== Demographics ==
Historical population
Year	Pop.	±%
2001	75,864	—
2011	94,065	+24.0%
Source: 2011 Census of India

Nauhatta is an entirely rural subdistrict, with no major urban centres. The block's sex ratio was 916 in 2011. The sex ratio was higher in the 0–6 age group, where it was 936. Members of scheduled castes made up 19.47% of the block population and members of scheduled tribes made up 11.88% (the latter percentage was the highest in Rohtas). The literacy rate of Nauhatta block was 63.07%, lowest in Rohtas, with a 23.02% literacy gap between men (74.05%) and women (51.03%).

Of the village of Nauhatta's 5,103 residents in 2011, 2,581 (50.58%) were male and 2,522 (49.42%) were female. 13.78% of the population was in the 0–6 age group. The literacy rate was 62.32% (69.20% among men and 55.27% among women).

=== Employment ===
The village of Nauhatta had 1,752 total workers in 2011, of whom 1,207 (68.89%) were male and 545 (31.11%) were female. There were a total of 386 cultivators (321 male and 65 female) who owned or leased their own land, 946 agricultural labourers (555 male and 391 female) who worked someone else's land for wages, 87 household industry workers (60 male and 27 female), and 333 other workers (271 male and 62 female).

== Amenities ==
In 2011, 19.08% of Nauhatta block households lived in permanent pucca houses, 58.74% lived in semi-permanent houses, and 21.99% lived in temporary kutcha houses. 3.19% of households primarily used tap water as a source of drinking water, 16.17% primarily used wells, and 78.92% primarily used hand pumps. In terms of lighting, 20.91% of households had electric lights and 77.9% used kerosene lamps. 5.79% of households had flush toilets, with 0.8% being connected to sewers and 4.51% to septic tanks; a large majority of block residents had no toilet at home, with 93.31% using open defecation. In terms of cooking, most households (79.55%) used firewood as fuel, with 13.38% using cow dung and 5.72% using crop residue. Most households (74.81%) did not have a kitchen at home; 20.41% did have kitchens. 58.53% of households had access to banking services.

20% of households owned radios in 2011, 12.91% had televisions, 0.5% had a computers with internet access and 7.07% had computers without internet, 1.67% had landline telephones and 55.31% had cell phones (1.52% had both), 43.01% had bicycles, 5.15% had motor scooters, motorcycles, or mopeds, and 1.36% had automobiles. 27.76% had none of the above items.

== Villages ==
Nauhatta is one of 68 villages in Nauhatta block. Of these, 65 are inhabited and 3 are uninhabited.

Village name	Total land area (hectares)	Population (in 2011)
Chunda	8,589	1,860
Piparadih	5,146	3,700
Katudanr	232	287
Basarhi	226	0
Gurur	95	0
Mujuraha	64	0
Tiara Khurd	295	1,340
Tiara Kalan	767	960
Nawadih Khurd	507	954
Amahuan	598	347
Madhkupia	432	962
Matiawan	637	1,412
Nawadih Kalan	366	948
Jadunathpur	1,117	1,658
Belduria	401	235
Jaradag	1,058	454
Parchha	649	4,458
Paruka	385	2,688
Tilokhar	496	3,626
Pararia	734	1,557
Tiura, Rohtas	2,131	5,563
Banua	342	1,112
Dumaria	75	351
Chaphla	248	559
Chaukhara	65	49
Lohara	263	2,560
Nauhatta (block headquarters)	497	5,103
Hama	112	806
Birki	94	108
Paharia	149	461
Karamdiha	158	1,101
Sihaldeh	264	552
Bhaunathpur	54	874
Uli Banahi	647	3,490
Mada Tipa	44	154
Tipa	40	746
Dhanauti	274	115
Baijalpur	98	190
Adhaura	340	263
Saguna	76	55
Bhurwa	522	743
Rehal	3,396	3,160
Dewadand	371	1,585
Nimahath	307	2,024
Jaintipur	492	2,270
Anandi Chak	132	1,265
Naudiha	110	1,233
Balbhadarpur	96	623
Hankarpur	77	480
Nawadih	286	226
Nawara	293	415
Kazipur	100	872
Baraicha	335	1,429
Kamal Khairwa	247	2,325
Auraiya	64	791
Amarkha	310	6
Bandu	465	1,078
Khairwa Khurd	91	877
Bhadara	694	3,686
Khandaul	70	90
Saraidanr	139	1,600
Baliari	152	498
Singhpur	356	1,106
Shahpur	272	4,026
Bishunpur	92	1,566
Gurisot	181	1,103
Bhangia	44	779
Daranagar	1,035	6,551

The village of Chunda is the largest village in Rohtas district in terms of physical area.
