= Rajpur, Rohtas =

Rajpur Rājpur
- Village
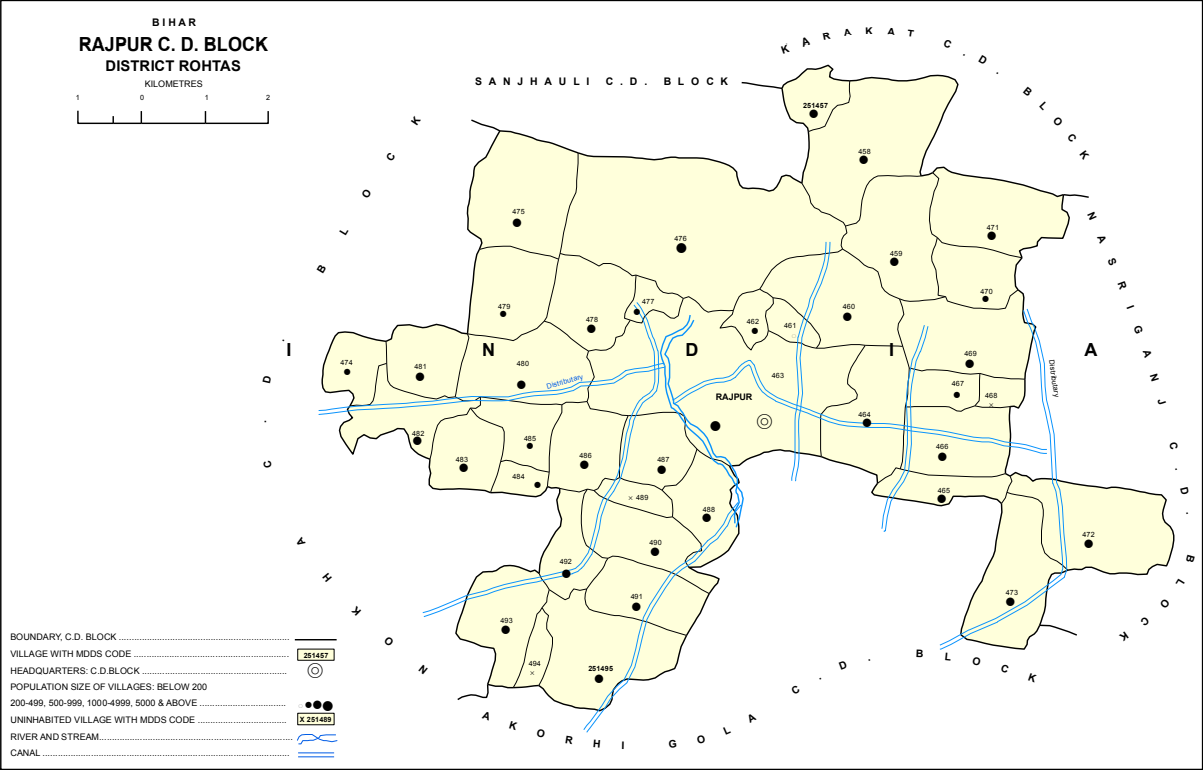

- Location in Bihar, India
- Coordinates: 25.07675°N 84.20551°E
- Country: India
- State: Bihar
- District: Rohtas

Area
  - Total: 7.05 km^{2} (2.72 sq mi)
- Elevation: 99 m (325 ft)

Population (2011)
  - Total: 11,780
  - Density: 1,670/km^{2} (4,330/sq mi)

Languages
  - Official: Hindi
- Time zone: UTC+5:30 (IST)
- PIN: 821111

Rajpur is a village and corresponding community development block in Rohtas district of Bihar, India. As of 2011, the village of Rajpur had a population of 11,780, in 1,778 households, while Rajpur block had a population of 75,213.

== Demographics ==
Between 2001 and 2011, the population of Rajpur block increased from 60,610 to 75,213, representing a 24.1% increase. In both census years, the block was classified as entirely rural, with no major urban areas.

In 2011, the sex ratio of Rajpur block was 915 females to every 1000 males, slightly below the district average of 921. The sex ratio was slightly higher in the 0-6 age group (922), which was also slightly below the district average (931).

Members of scheduled castes numbered 12,964 in 2011, representing 17.24% of the block's total population; slightly below the Rohtas district average of 18.57%. There were 17 members of scheduled tribes, making up a negligible percentage of the total population. The sex ratio among both groups was lowest in Rajpur among Rohtas sub-districts.

The literacy rate of Rajpur block was 75.99% in 2011, slightly higher than the Rohtas district average of 73.37%. Literacy was higher in men (85.89%) than in women (65.16%); the corresponding gender gap of 20.73% was roughly average among Rohtas sub-districts. Rajpur block had the highest literacy rate among scheduled caste members, with 64.4% compared to the district average of 60.3%.

=== Employment ===
Most of Rajpur block's workforce was engaged in agriculture as of 2011, with 24.68% being cultivators who owned or leased their own land and a further 48.49% being agricultural labourers who worked another person's land for wages. Another 4.34% were engaged in household industries, and the remaining 20.29% were engaged in other forms of work.

== Amenities ==
=== Rajpur village ===
The village of Rajpur has a medical centre. It has tap water; drinking water is also provided via well and hand pump. However, it does not have public toilets. It has a post office, landline and cell phone coverage, and Internet access. There is a railway station and bus service. Rajpur also has permanent pucca roads, which are connected to national highways. There is a bank and agricultural credit society. The village hosts a daily mandi as well as a weekly haat. There is a community centre with sports fields, a cinema, and a public library. The village also has access to electricity.

=== Rajpur block ===
Of the 36 inhabited villages in Rajpur block, 32 had schools as of 2011, serving 97.11% of the population. 3 villages had medical facilities, serving 19.3% of the population. All villages had access to drinking water, although not all of them had tap water, and 11 of them had post offices. Half of the villages (18) had telephone access, serving 66.01% of the population. 21 villages had permanent pucca roads, serving 67.46% of the population. 30 villages had electrical power, serving 95.01% of the population.

== Villages ==
Rajpur block contains 39 villages, 36 inhabited and 3 uninhabited:

Village name	Total land area (hectares)	Population (in 2011)
Dehri	79	1,671
Barana	365	3,031
Amarpur	235	1,499
Pakari	226	2,408
Patkhaulia	43	165
Misraulia	46	831
Rajpur (capital)	705	11,780
Sabea	216	1,727
Rajandih	138	2,761
Amarhi	165	1,318
Nachania	68	609
Nirajanpur	51	0
Mangraulia	232	2,111
Malawan	114	808
Sakhara	229	2,515
Tarawan	307	3,891
Dhobdiha	229	1,891
Nawadih	72	687
Kujhi	267	1,842
Sianwak	781	8,189
Harbanspur	31	652
Bhatauli	151	1,924
Bhaluahi	174	668
Pararia	208	2,824
Gurdihin	119	1,531
Sultanpur	158	1,293
Baranw	117	1,230
Parasia	58	945
Baraicha	108	719
Mahuari	139	1,340
Chhanha	113	1,013
Karamkila	139	1,746
Chand Simarhat	71	0
Bisunpur	146	1,903
Kusadhar	153	1,831
Baghaila	108	1,070
Rutawan	172	2,758
Madanpur	37	0
Suara	270	2,032
