= Maghigawan =

Majhigawan
- village
- Location in Bihar, India Majhigawan (India)
- Coordinates: 24.597256°N 83.941121°E
- Country: India
- State: Bihar
- District: Rohtas

Languages
  - Official: Maithili, Hindi
- Time zone: UTC+5:30 (IST)
- ISO 3166 code: IN-BR

Maghigawan is a village in India, located in Rohtas District, Bihar. According to the 2011 census of India, it has a population of 1904 people.
