= Satasa =

Coordinates: 25.191°N 83.942°E

Satsa is a village in Kochas Block in Rohtas District of Bihar State, India. It's come under Balathari Panchayat.
