= Habbupur =

- Village
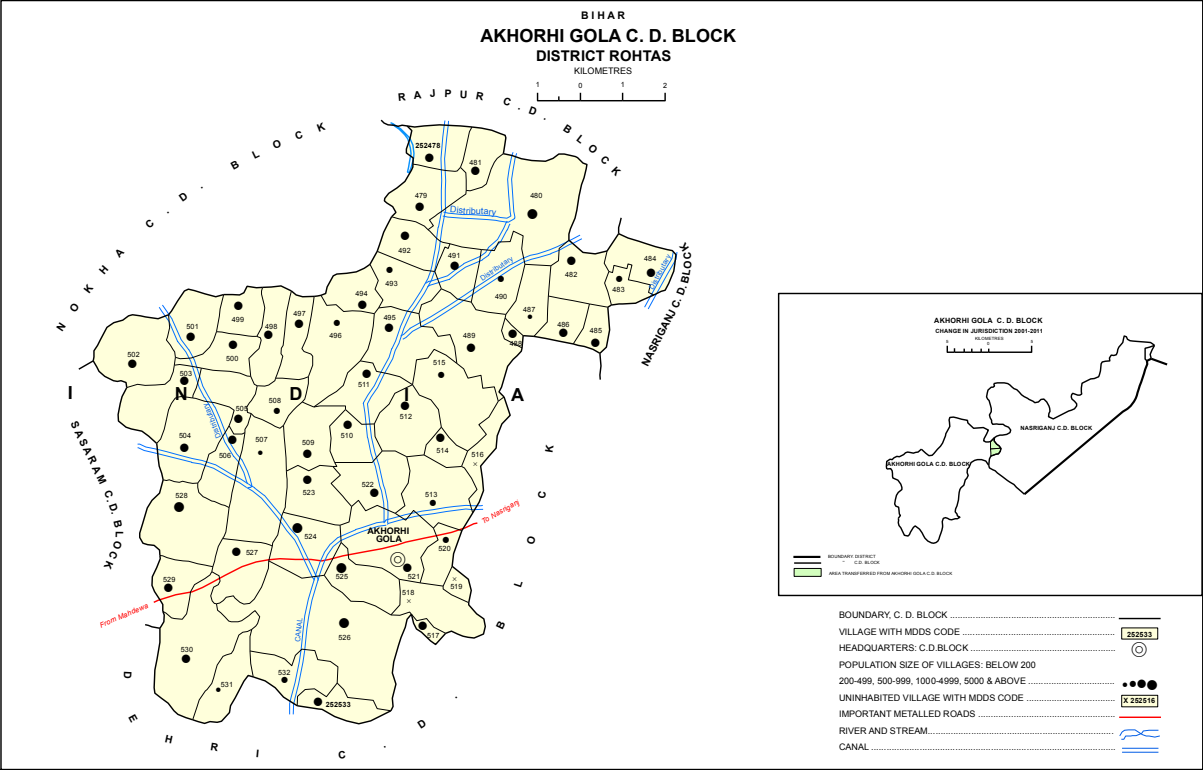
- Map of Habbupur (#252478) in Akorhi Gola block

- Location in Bihar, India
- Coordinates: 25.06103°N 84.21175°E
- Country: India
- State: Bihar
- District: Rohtas

Area
  - Total: 1.417 km^{2} (0.547 sq mi)
- Elevation: 101 m (331 ft)

Population (2011)
  - Total: 1,247
  - Density: 880.0/km^{2} (2,279/sq mi)

Languages
  - Official: Hindi
- Time zone: UTC+5:30 (IST)

Habbupur is a village in Akorhi Gola block of Rohtas district in Bihar, India. As of 2011, its population was 1,247, in 210 households. It covers an area of 141.7 hectares, of which most is under agricultural use: 118.9 hectares are farmland, all of which is irrigated, and the remaining 22.8 hectares are under non-agricultural use.
