= Nokha =

Nokha may refer to:

- Nokha, Bikaner, town in Bikaner district, Rajasthan
- Nokha, Rohtas, town in Rohtas District, Bihar
- Nokha, Bihar Assembly constituency, one of the 243 assembly constituencies of Bihar
- Nokha, Rajasthan Assembly constituency
