= Parwalpur =

- Small Town.
- Location within Bihar Location within India
- Coordinates: 25.208959°N 85.366151°E
- Country: India
- Elevation: 59 m (194 ft)

Language
  - Official: Hindi
  - Local: Magahi

Parwalpur or Parbalpur is a small town and an administrative block of Nalanda district, Bihar. The town is about 15km from Bihar Sharif and about 15km from Ekangarsarai.
