= Adapur =

- Town
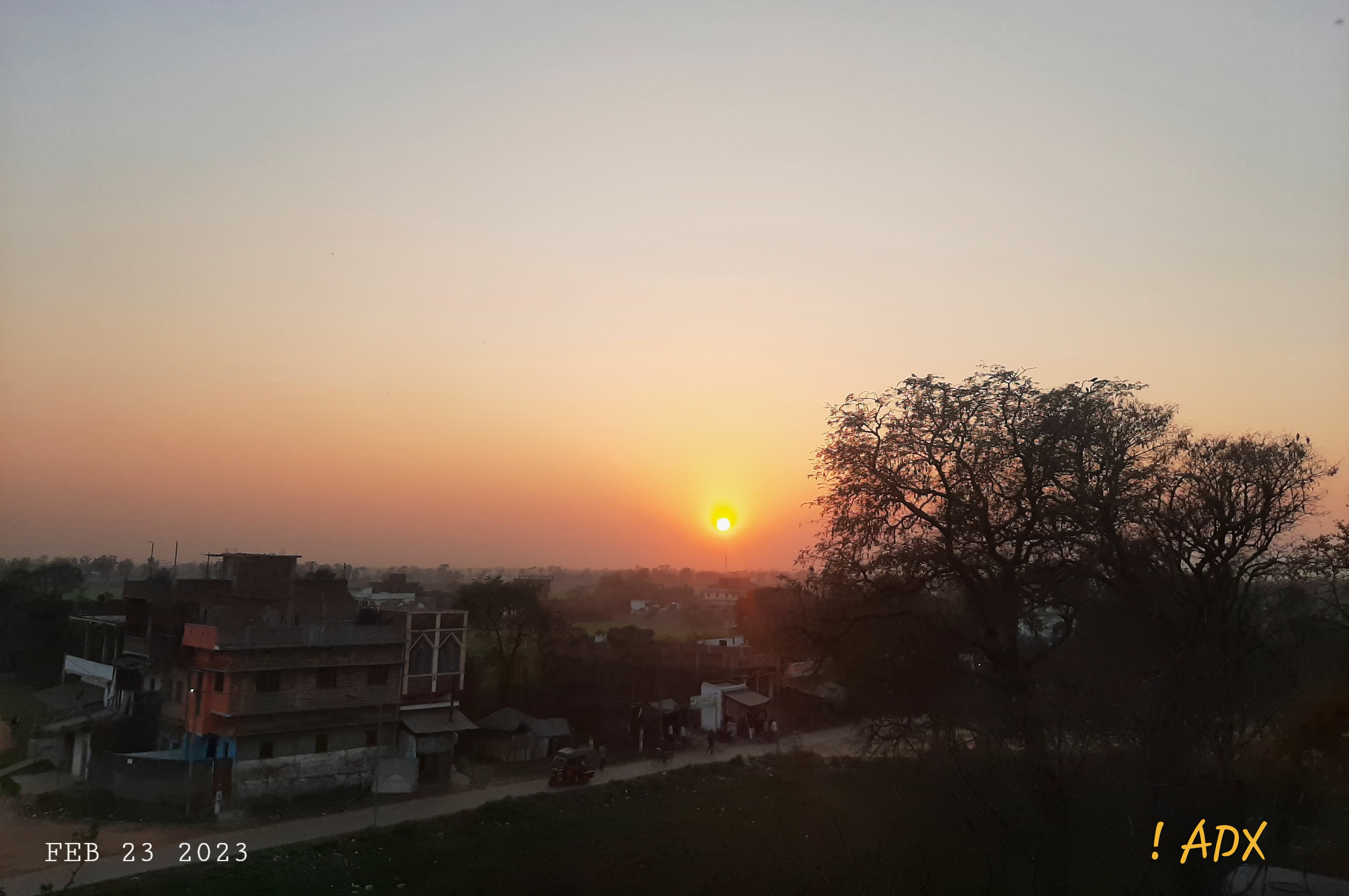
- Adapur Railway Station

- Location within Bihar
- Coordinates: 26.92530300°N 84.94236200°E
- Country: India
- State: Bihar
- District: East Champaran district
- District Headquarter: Motihari
- Block: Adapur
- Elevation: 88 m (289 ft)

Population (2011)
  - Total: 20,351

Languages
  - Official: Hindi
  - Regional: Bhojpuri
  - Additional: English, Nepali, Odia, Bengali
- Time zone: UTC+5:30 (IST)
- PIN: 845301
- Telephone code: +06255
- Vehicle registration: BR-05
- Nearest town: Raxaul, Motihari, Sugauli, Sitamarhi, Darbhanga, Samastipur, Muzaffarpur, Birgunj
- Website: eastchamparan.bih.nic.in

Adapur is a block in East Champaran district of Bihar, India. Adapur railway station is located 40 kilometres (25 mi) north of Motihari, the district headquarters. The state capital Patna is 175 kilometres (109 mi) in south. Adapur is located on the India-Nepal border.

== Demographics ==
According to the 2011 census, Adapur has a population of 20,351 people. The sex ratio is 949 females per 1000 males. The literacy rate is 41.12%.

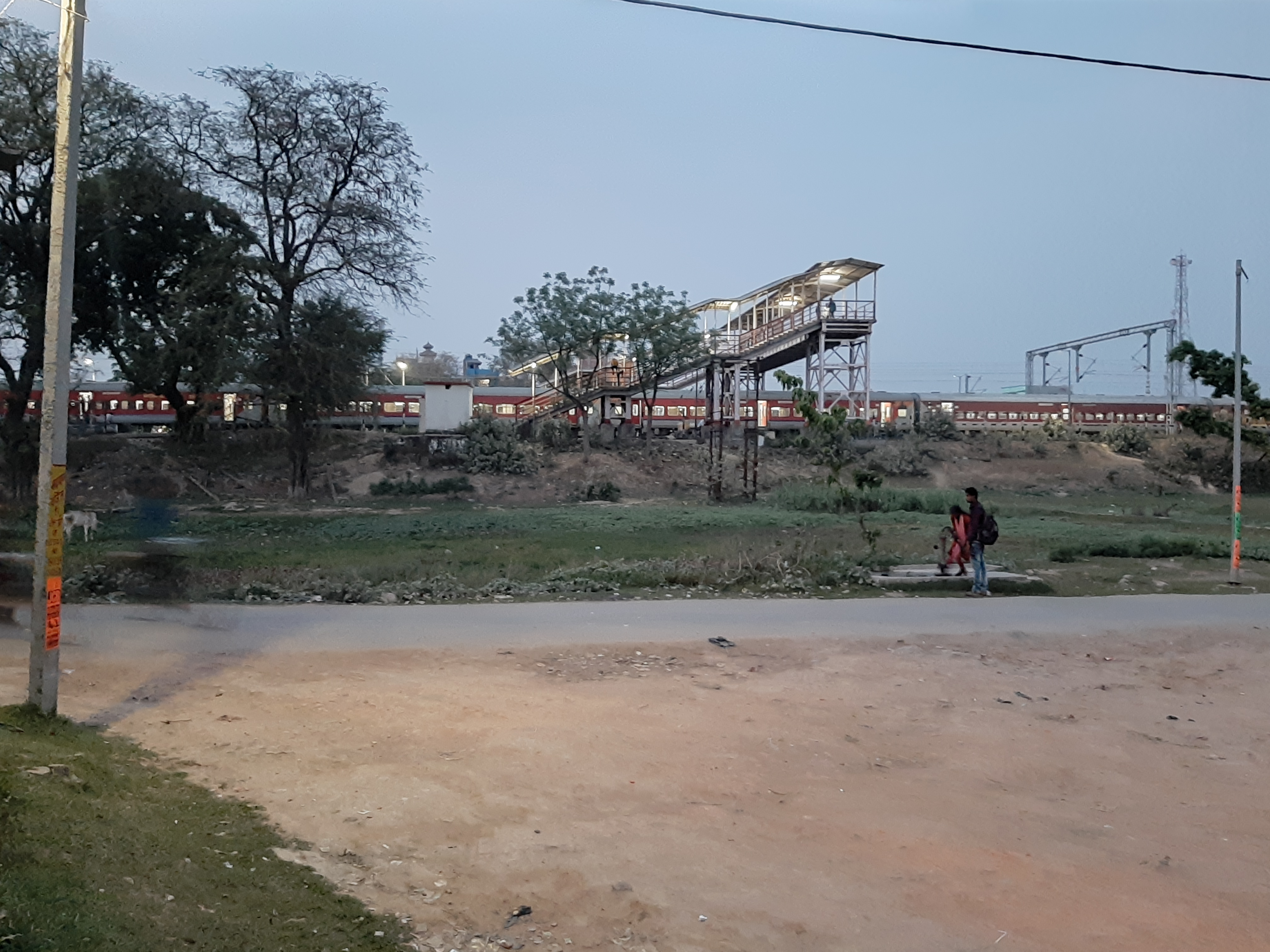
Mumbai Lokmanya Tilak Terminus Antyodaya Express Standing at Adapur Railway Station

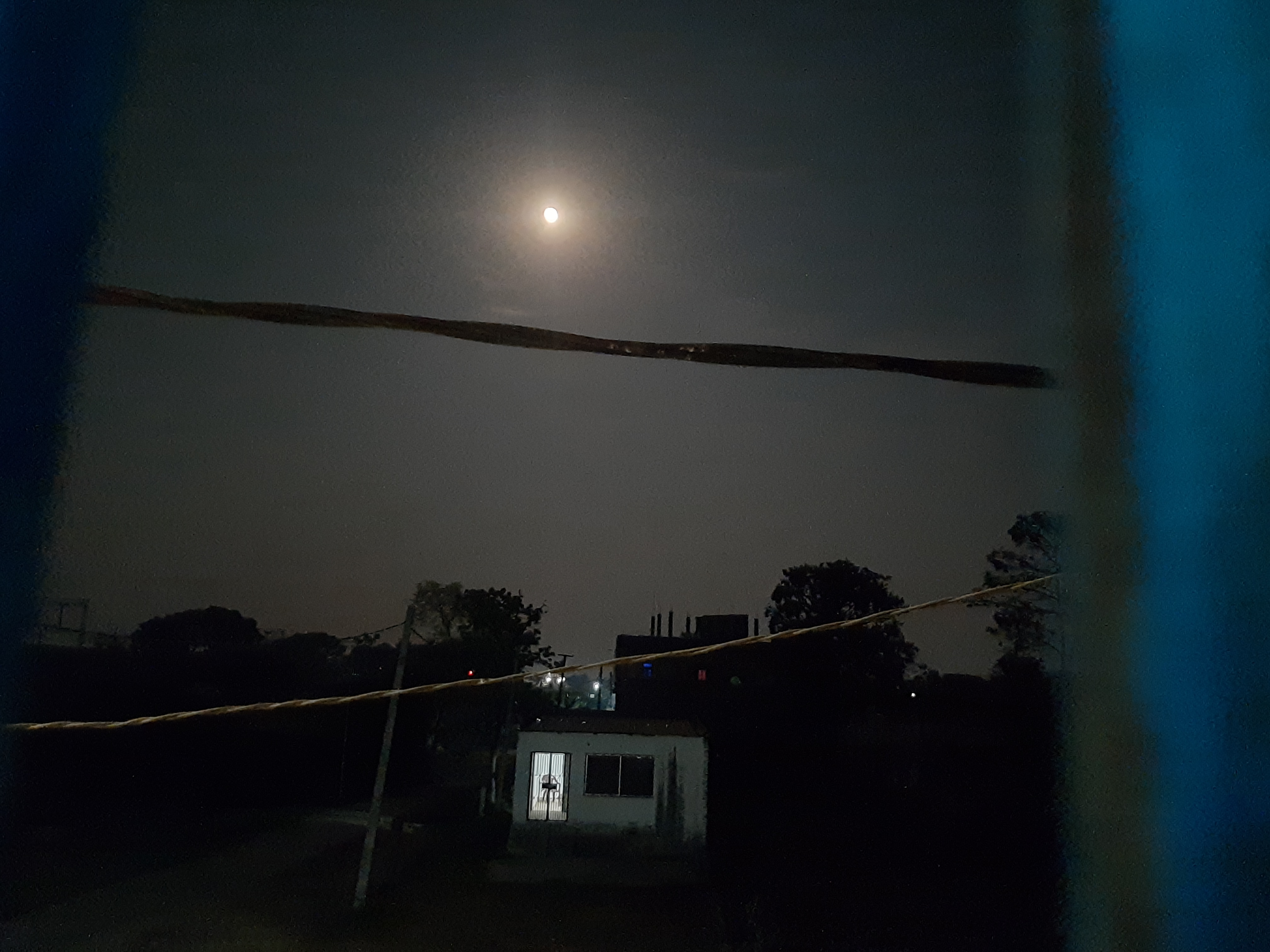
Adapur Sky At Night

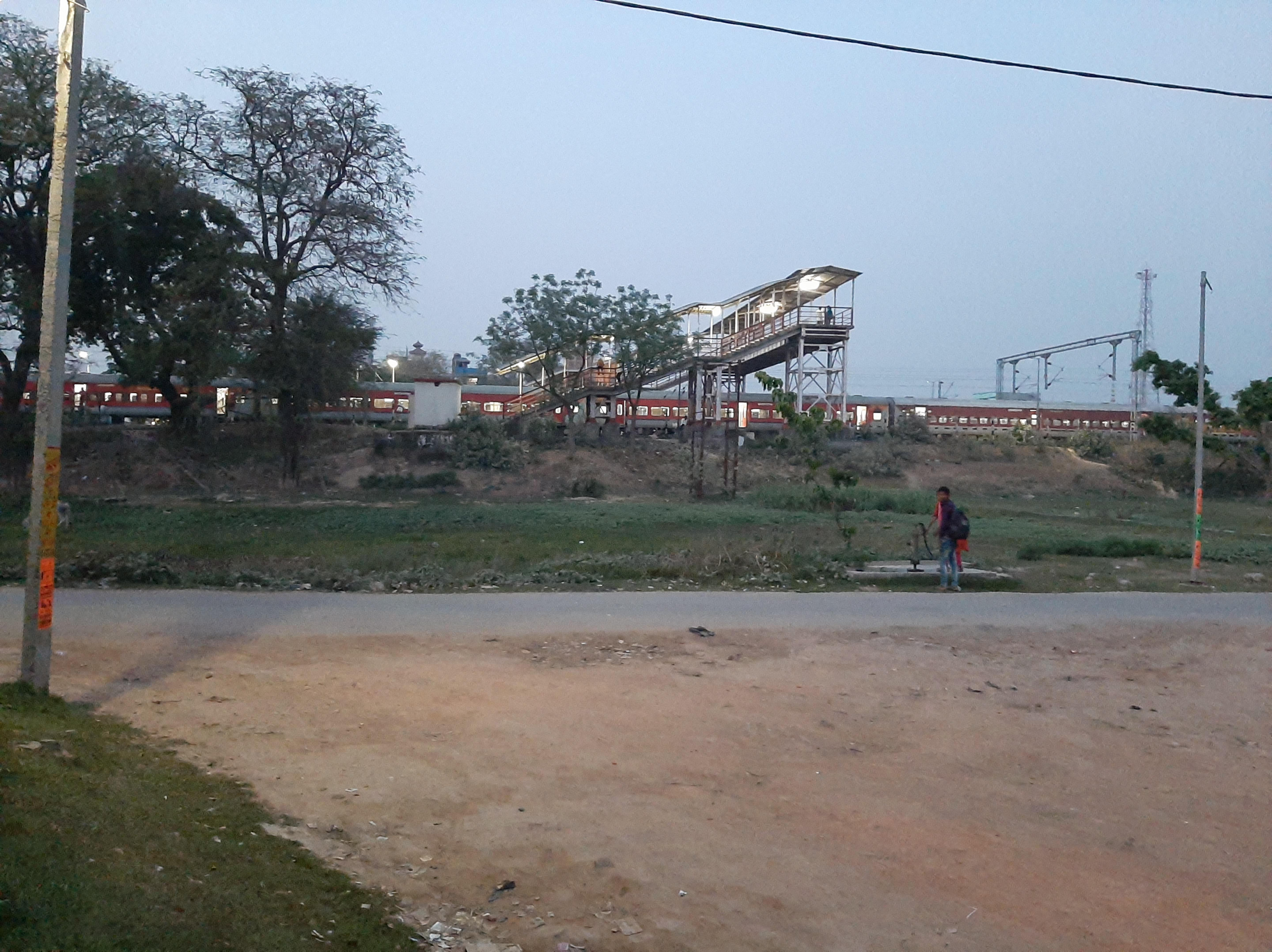
Raxaul Sadbhawana Express Standing At Adapur Railway Station

== Transportation ==
Adapur is well connected to the major towns of Bihar by road and rail. Raxaul is the near major junction to connect metro cities Delhi, Mumbai, Kolkata and Hyderabad, by rail. Currently only local trains stop here towards Raxaul- Narkatiaganj and Sitamarhi- Darbhanga route.

=== Air ===
Nearest airport is located in Nepal at Simara Airport, about 38 kilometres (24 mi) from Adapur. Another airport at Raxaul Airport, about 13 km away, is drafted to be operational in the future. Jay Prakash Narayan International Airport Patna is the operational airport.

=== Railways ===
Adapur has a railway station on the Broad gauge Raxaul-Sitamarhi line. The station code of this railway station is ADX. All the rail lines are electrified but both electric and diesel engines runs for better connectivity. There are 3 platforms in the railway station and 4 rail lines.

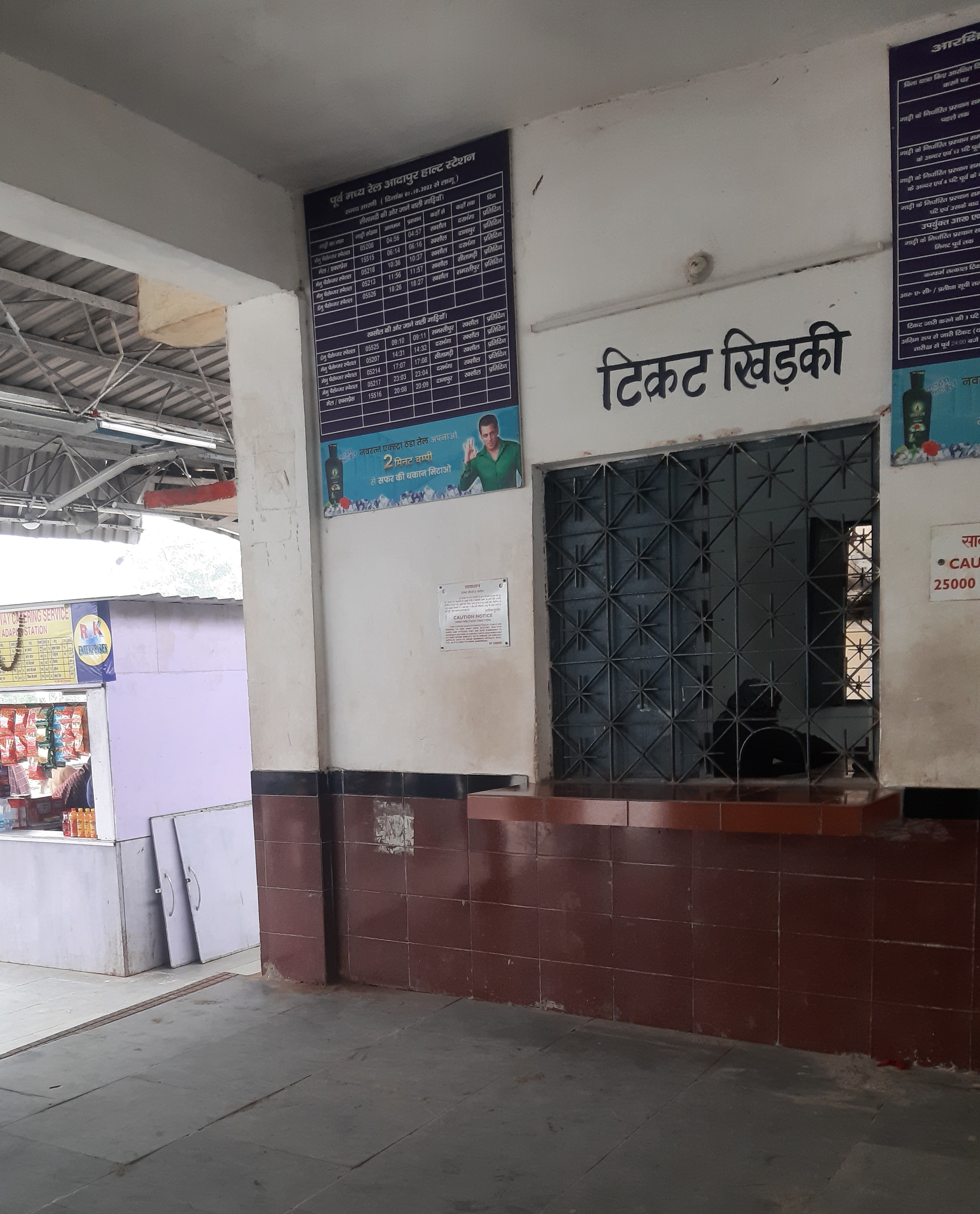
Ticket office - One can purchase unserved tickets here.

Trains at Adapur Railway StationTowards Sitamarhi Junction (SMI)
Train Number	Train Name	Departure from Raxaul	Arrival at Adapur	Arrival at Sitamarhi
63374	Raxaul-Darbhanga MEMU	4:00 AM	4:17 AM	6:30 AM
15515	Danapur MEMU Express	6:00 AM	6:14 AM	8:00 AM
75230	Raxaul-Darbhanga DEMU	10:35 AM	10:50 AM	1:30 PM
55581	Raxaul-Sitamarhi Passenger	11:40 AM	11:57 AM	2:25 PM
15501	Raxaul-Jogbani Express	12:40 PM	12:54 PM	2:48 PM
55578	Raxaul-Samastipur Passenger	6:50 PM	7:06 PM	9:30 PM

Towards Raxaul Junction (RXL)
Train Number	Train Name	Departure from Chauradano	Arrival at Adapur	Arrival at Raxaul Junction
55577	Samastipur-Raxaul Passenger	9:04 AM	9:15 AM	10:00 AM
15502	Jogbani-Raxaul Express	9:58 AM	10:38 AM	11:15 AM
75229	Darbhanga-Raxaul DEMU	2:43 PM	2:56 PM	4:00 PM
55582	Sitamarhi-Raxaul Passenger	5:02 PM	5:17 PM	6:15 PM
15516	Sugauli MEMU Express	8:02 PM	8:11 PM	8:55 PM
63373	Darbhanga-Raxaul MEMU	10:49 PM	11:02 PM	11:40 PM
