= Hello Kaun =

Single by Ritesh Pandey and Sneh Upadhyay

Single by Ritesh Pandey and Sneh Upadhyay
- Language: Bhojpuri
- Released: 10 December 2019
- Genre: Pop; Rap
- Length: 3:04
- Label: Riddhi Music World
- Songwriter: Ashish Verma
- Producer: Ashish Verma

Ritesh Pandey singles chronology
"Gori Tori Chunari Ba Lal Lal Re" (2019)	"Hello Kaun" (2019)	"Lockdown Me Ludo" (2020)

Sneh Upadhyay singles chronology
"Hello Kaun" (2019)	"Muje Ishq Sikha Karke" (2020)

Music video
- "Hello Kaun" on YouTube

Hello Kaun is a Bhojpuri song sung by Ritesh Pandey featuring himself and Sneh Upadhyay. It is written and composed by Ashish Verma and directed by Rajeev Pandey. It is first Bhojpuri song and 29th Indian song to get more than 1 Billion+ views on YouTube.

== Background ==
The song was released on 9 December 2019 on YouTube by Riddhi Music World.

== Versions ==
=== Hariyanvi version ===
Hariyanvi version of this song released in January 2020 which was sung by Vijay Varma and Renuka Panwar. The lyrics were written by Vijay Varma and Andy Dahiya.

== Music charts ==
This song ranked first on Global YouTube Music Video Chart in 2020.
