= Ramgarhwa, Bihar =

Village in East Champaran district of Bihar state, India

Ramgarhwa
- town
- Location in Bihar, India
- Coordinates: 26.7766°N 85.1167°E
- Country: India
- State: Bihar
- District: Purbi Champaran
- Time zone: UTC+5:30 (IST)
- PIN: 845433
- Telephone code: 06255
- ISO 3166 code: IN-BR
- Vehicle registration: BR-05
- Website: eastchamparan.bih.nic.in

Ramgarhwa is a village town in the East Champaran district of Bihar state, India. It is situated 15 kilometres (9.3 mi) before the India–Nepal border on National Highway 527D and is directly connected to Kathmandu, the capital of Nepal. The town is 40 km from the district HQ, Motihari, and falls under the Raxaul sub-division. It is well connected by railway, and direct trains are available for Delhi and Kolkata from Ramgarhwa railway station.

This region is quite underdeveloped but making progress swiftly in infrastructure, education and medical facilities. The market is expanding at a rapid rate, and quality of life is showing an upward trend. Ramgarhwa is a panchayat, and a mukhiya is elected every 5 years to take care the civic needs of the town. It also has a police station and a post office. For education there are many government and private schools, but it has only one CBSE-affiliated school—Creation Gurukool, which educates students up to +2 level, after which students have to attend schools in nearby cities for their graduation degree.

Flood severely affects the surroundings of the town every year, but the main town generally is safe from flood waters, as the national highway and railway line act as embankments to prevent flood water from entering the town. Generally the climate is on the hotter side, and rainfall is severe during monsoon season.

The majority of the people are Hindus, though the town also has a significant number of Muslims. A very small number of Christians are also present in Ramagarhwa.

The Tilava Nadi River flows through the east side of the town, and many small temples are situated at the banks of that river. Chhath Puja, which is the most important festival of Bihar, has been celebrated on the banks of the Tilava Nadi with wide-scale festivities.
