= Gupta Dham =

Shrine in Bihar, India

Gupteshwar Mahadev
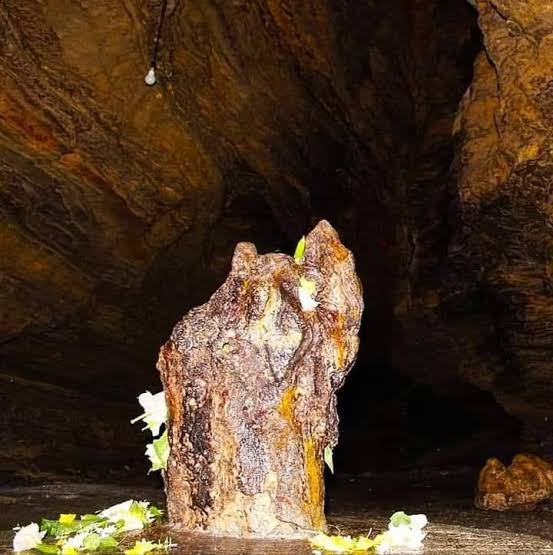

- Location in Bihar Location in India

Religion
- Affiliation: Hinduism
- Deity: Shiva
- Festival: Mahashivaratri

Location
- Location: Bihar
- Country: India
- Interactive map of Gupteshwar Mahadev
- Coordinates: 24.76603°N 83.80725°E

Architecture
- Type: Cave Temple
- Temple: 1

Gupta Dham, also known as Gupteshwar Cave Temple, is a natural cave temple dedicated to Lord Shiva. It is a pilgrim site located in the Kaimur range in Rohtas district of Bihar. The cave is known for a natural rock formation resembling a Shivling called Gupteshwar Mahadev.

== Location ==
The cave lies at the foot of the eastern flank of the Chunda (also known as Goptha, Gupta, Gupteswar) hill in the Rohtas Plateau, the most eastern extension of the Kaimur Range.

== History ==
The Gupteshwar Cave Temple is traditionally linked to the legend of Bhasmasura, a demon who misused a blessings granted by Lord Vishnu. According to local folklore, Lord Shiva intervened to protect Vishnu and killed Bhasmasura at this site, giving the cave its religious significance.

== See also ==
- Maa Tara Chandi Temple
