= Ritesh Pandey (singer) =

Indian singer and actor

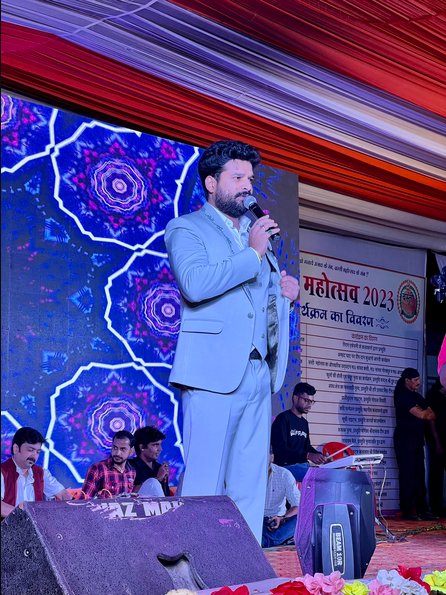
- Ritesh Pandey Performing in 2023
- Born: 14 May 1991 (age 35); Sasaram, Bihar, India
- Other name: Bhojpuriya Rockstar
- Occupations: Actor; Singer; Politician
- Years active: 2014–present
- Political party: Jan Suraaj Party
- Musical career
- Genres: Bhojpuri Cinema; Pop
- Instrument: Pump organ
- Labels: Wave Music; RN Digital Records; Speed Records; Worldwide Records; Enter10 Music Bhojpuri

Ritesh Ranjan (born 14 May 1991), known professionally as Ritesh Pandey is an Indian playback singer, model and actor, who works in Bhojpuri cinema. He got fame after his work in the films titled Balma Bihar Wala 2 (2016) and Tohre Me Basela Pran (2017). His song "Hello Kaun" had over 1 Billion views on YouTube and reached No. 1 on Global YouTube Music Videos Chart in 2020 becoming the most viewed Bhojpuri song ever. Ritesh Pandey was announced as the candidate for the Kargahar assembly seat in Rohtas district for the Jan Suraaj Party. On October 9, 2025, he confirmed his candidacy for the Kargahar seat (Assembly No. 209) in Rohtas.

== Filmography ==
- India Vs Pakistan
- Darar 2
- Yaara Teri Yaari
- Kashi Vishwanath
- Parvarish
- Rani weds Raja
- Nache Naagin Gali Gali
- Karam Yug
- Tohre Me Basela Pran
- Daag Ego Lanchan
- Bewafa

=== Web series ===
- Lanka Me Danka

== Discography ==
- Hello Kaun

== Political career ==
On July 18, 2025, Ritesh Pandey officially joined the Jan Suraaj Party in Patna, alongside former IPS officer Jaiprakash Singh, with party founder Prashant Kishor present.

Ritesh Pandey was announced as the candidate for the Kargahar assembly seat in Rohtas district for the Jan Suraaj Party. On October 9, 2025, he confirmed his candidacy for the Kargahar seat (Assembly No. 209) in Rohtas.
