= Ben, Bihar =

Village in Bihar, India

Ben
- Village
- Location in Bihar, India
- Coordinates: 25.15072°N 85.36091°E
- Country: India
- State: Bihar
- District: Nalanda
- Sub-district: Ben

Area
  - Total: 2.99 km^{2} (1.15 sq mi)

Population (2011)
  - Total: 3,872
  - Density: 1,290/km^{2} (3,350/sq mi)
- Time zone: UTC+5:30 (IST)
- PIN: 803114

Ben is a village and corresponding community development block of Nalanda district, Bihar. As of 2011, it has a population of 6,525, in 1,144 households.

== Demographics ==
As of 2011, Ben had a population of 6,525, in 1,144 households. This population was 51.4% male (3,352) and 48.6% female (3,173). The 0-6 age group numbered 1,133 (594 male and 539 female), making up 17.4% of the total population. 1,267 residents were members of Scheduled Castes, or 19.4% of the total.

The 1961 census recorded Ben (then part of Patna district) as having a total population of 2,604 people (1,296 male and 1,308 female), in 467 households and 438 physical houses. The area of the village was given as 1,919 acres and it had 2 primary schools, a maktab and a madrasa, a hospital, and a post office at that point.

== Infrastructure ==
As of 2011, Ben had 5 primary schools, 2 secondary schools, and 1 primary health centre. Drinking water was provided by tap, well, hand pump, and tube well/bore well; there were no public toilets. The village had a post office but no public library; there was at least some access to electricity for all purposes. Streets were made of pakka materials.

== Villages ==
The following 32 villages are counted as part of Ben CD block:

1. Akauna
2. Amia Bigha
3. Arawan
4. At
5. Babhaniawan
6. Bara
7. Ben
8. Birbal Bigha
9. Dharhara
10. Eksara
11. Gangti
12. Jafra
13. Janaro
14. Jangharo
15. Karjara
16. Khaira
17. Kolhua
18. Kosnara
19. Kutlupur
20. Madhaur
21. Majira
22. Makhdumpur
23. Mari
24. Marsua
25. Mashespur
26. Mohammadpur
27. Murgawan
28. Nohsa
29. Ramganj
30. Saure
31. Sehri
32. Sidhi Bigha
