= Sanjhauli =

Sanjhauli Sajhauli
- Village
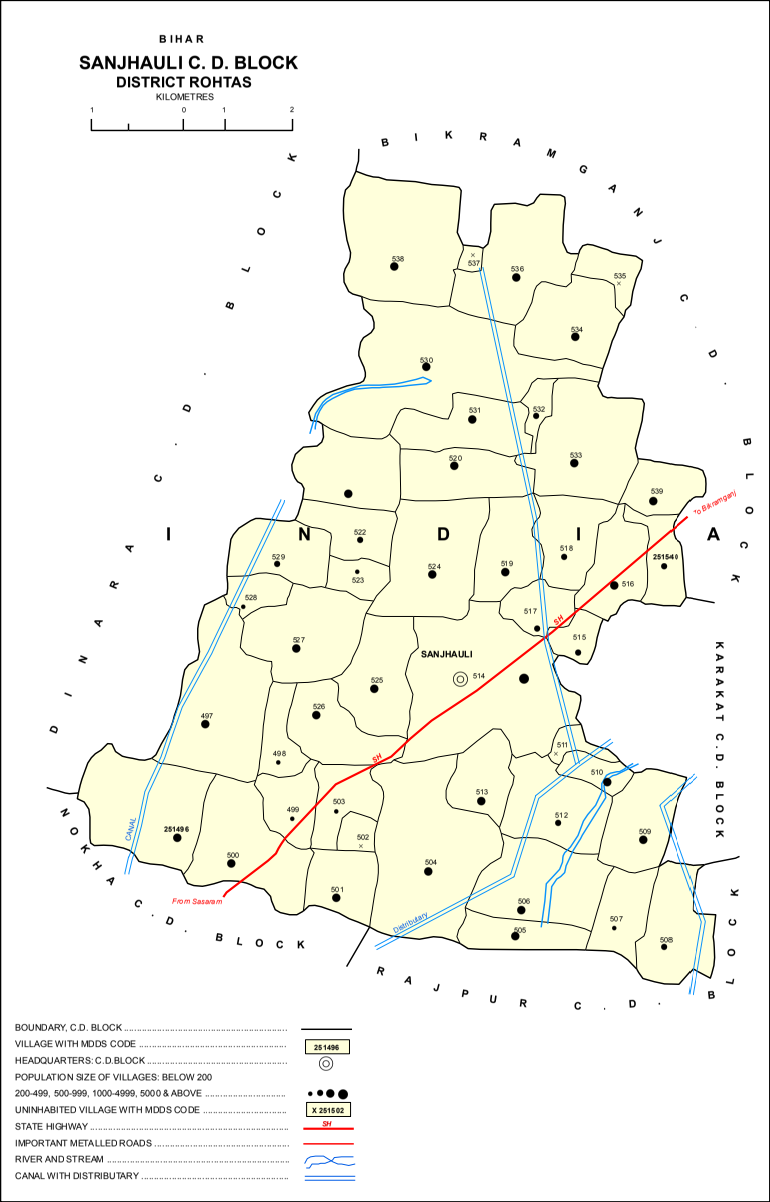

- Location in Bihar, India
- Coordinates: 25.14547°N 84.18392°E
- Country: India
- State: Bihar
- District: Rohtas

Area
  - Total: 4.334 km^{2} (1.673 sq mi)
- Elevation: 97 m (318 ft)

Population (2011)
  - Total: 7,608
  - Density: 1,755/km^{2} (4,547/sq mi)

Languages
  - Official: Hindi
- Time zone: UTC+5:30 (IST)
- PIN: 82220

Sanjhauli, also spelled Sajhauli, is a village and corresponding community development block in Rohtas district of Bihar, India. As of 2011, the village of Sanjhauli had a population of 7,608, in 1,269 households, while the entire block had a population of 62,621. The nearest major city is Bikramganj.

== Demographics ==
Sanjhauli is an entirely rural subdistrict, with no major urban centers. Sanjhauli block's population increased from 51,465 in 2001 to 62,621 in 2011, representing a 21.7% increase. In both census years, the block had the second-lowest population in the block, with only Suryapura having fewer people.

The sex ratio of Sanjhauli block was 915 in 2011, slightly below the district average of 918. The sex ratio was lower in the 0-6 age group, at 910.

Members of scheduled castes numbered 10,714 in Sanjhauli block in 2011, making up 17.11% of the population.

Literacy in Sanjhauli block was slightly above average for Rohtas district in 2011, with 76.47% of the population able to read and write compared to the district average of 73.37%. Literacy was higher in men than in women, with 86.71% of males but only 65.30% of females able to read and write; the corresponding 21.41% literacy gender gap was about average for the district.

=== Employment ===
Most people in Sanjhauli block were engaged in agriculture in 2011. 37.12% of the workforce were cultivators who owned or leased their own land (the largest proportion in Rohtas), and a further 42.20% were agricultural labourers who worked someone else's land for money. 3.95% of the workforce was employed in household industries, and 16.73% were employed in other forms of work.

== Amenities ==
Sanjhauli does not have tap water, with drinking water instead being supplied by hand pump. It has bus service and a train station along with river-based transport. It has permanent pucca roads, which are connected to state and national highways. The village hosts a daily mandi as well as a weekly haat. It has a bank with an ATM as well as an agricultural credit society. There is a community centre, a public library, and sports fields. There are no movie theatres.

On the block level, 32 of the 41 inhabited villages in Sanjhauli block had schools, serving 93.65% of the population. 2 villages had medical facilities, serving 18.7% of the population. All villages had access to drinking water, although only two, Masauna and Basaura, had access to tap water. 34 had telephone coverage, serving 89.45% of the population, and 7 villages had post offices. 3 villages had banks and agricultural credit societies, and 33 had transportation communications (rail, bus, or navigable waterways). 31 villages had permanent pucca roads. 39 villages had electricity, serving 98.73% of the block population.

== Villages ==
There are 45 villages in Sanjhauli block, including Sanjhauli itself; 41 are inhabited and 4 are uninhabited.

Village name	Total land area (hectares)	Population (in 2011)
Amaithi	283.7	3,228
Masauna	306.7	2,344
Barauli	71.3	288
Sikati	77.3	297
Susari	241.6	2,366
Samhauta	108.9	1,062
Dhangaon	24.3	0
Dhokra	100.4	367
Udaipur	414.4	4,101
Chaita Bahori	110.1	1,190
Chaita	203	1,960
Chapurwa	87	493
Chhulkar	144.4	765
Chauria	145.2	1,171
Bazidpur	64.3	1,188
Karma	22.3	0
Buknawan	162.3	995
Garura	106.4	1,178
Sanjhauli (block headquarters)	433.4	7,608
Khutaha	42.9	561
Bairi	283.7	1,501
Koni	85.8	870
Khatalpur	120.2	520
Bagiya	137.9	1,304
Jigni	134.7	1,102
Tendua	169.4	1,579
Karma	106.4	507
Usra	44.9	462
Kaithi	261.1	1,516
Majhauli	157.8	1,636
Basaura	122.2	1,894
Siaruwa	214.4	1,858
Jamuhari	63.6	483
Motihari	104.4	871
Tilai	445.2	2,701
Rajadih	140	1,104
Misrauliya	37.6	753
Karmaini	253	2,507
Aunrai	145.2	1,741
Tamoli Khap	70.4	0
Khaira Bhutaha	225	1,343
Uruwa	14.2	0
Chandi English	321.7	2,788
Amadah	81	1,463
Soni	93.4	956
