= Kargahar =

- Village
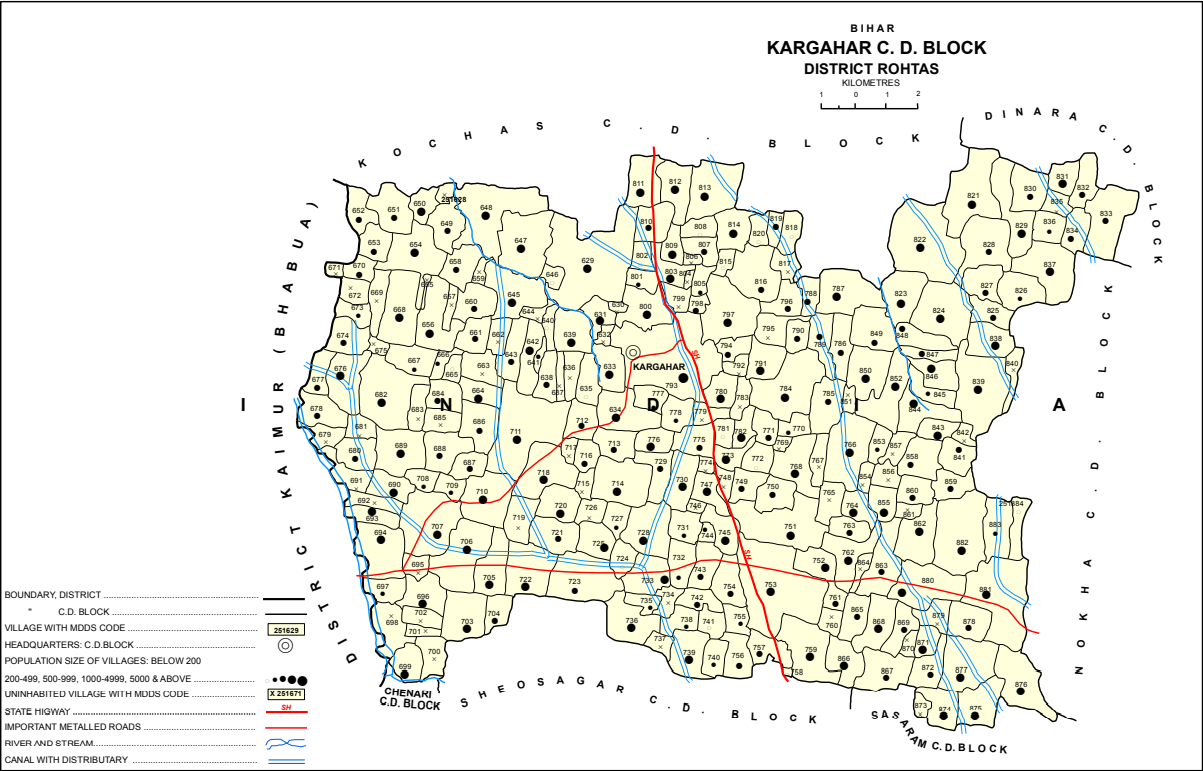

- Location in Bihar, India Kargahar (India)
- Coordinates: 25.12671°N 83.92745°E
- Country: India
- State: Bihar
- District: Rohtas

Area
  - Total: 6.25 km^{2} (2.41 sq mi)
- Elevation: 94 m (308 ft)

Population (2011)
  - Total: 10,170
  - Density: 1,630/km^{2} (4,210/sq mi)

Languages
  - Official: Hindi
- Time zone: UTC+5:30 (IST)
- PIN: 821107

Kargahar is a village and corresponding community development block in Rohtas district of Bihar, India. As of 2011, the population of Kargahar was 10,170, in 1,464 households, while the population of Kargahar block was 225,082, in 31,528 households. The nearest city is Sasaram, the district headquarters.

== Demographics ==
Historical population
Year	Pop.	±%
2001	179,556	—
2011	225,082	+25.4%
Source: 2011 Census of India

Kargahar is an entirely rural block, with no large urban centres. The sex ratio of the block in 2011 was 908 females to every 1000 males, which was the lowest among rural areas in Rohtas. The sex ratio was higher in the 0-6 age group, with 918 males for every 1000 females. Members of scheduled castes made up 21.02% of the population and members of scheduled tribes made up 0.26%. The literacy rate of Kargahar block was 75.92%, higher than the district rate of 73.37%. There was an 18.71% literacy gender gap in the block, with 84.82% of men but only 66.11% of women able to read and write, a slightly smaller gap than the district gap of 19.91%.

=== Employment ===
A majority of Kargahar block's workforce was engaged in agriculture in 2011, with 31.77% of workers being cultivators who owned or leased their own land and a further 44.45% being agricultural labourers who worked another person's land for wages. 7.13% worked as household industry workers, and the remaining 16.66% were other workers.

== Amenities ==
Of the 198 inhabited villages in Kargahar block, 143 have schools and 10 have medical facilities. 26 have post offices and 66 have telephone service. 12 have banks and agricultural credit societies. 87 have permanent pucca roads. 151 have electrical power, serving 89.65% of block residents. All 198 villages had access to drinking water, but only 21 of them had tap water (Kargahar itself not being one of them). In the rest, drinking water was mainly supplied via well and hand pump. Kargahar village also has a public library, a community centre with sports fields, a regular mandi, and a weekly haat.

== Villages ==
Kargahar block has 257 villages, of which 198 are inhabited and 59 are uninhabited:

Village name	Total land area (hectares)	Population (in 2011)
Kamdewa	33	0
Siwan	599	3,673
Patkha	24	0
Shiwapur	107	1,022
Basgitia	20	0
Nimdehra	130	1,966
Bamhan Barahta	166	1,301
Bhainsadih	101	84
Bariyarpatti	70	0
Bikram	41	0
Barahta	100	678
Kumhila	148	1,453
Ranitali	45	26
Rohdaspatti	23	255
Ararua	109	1,599
Hamirpur	119	983
Gajaundha	42	0
Akorhi	218	1,273
Shahababad	73	84
Kharej	307	1,649
Dhanej	385	3,634
Nemura	135	754
Intawa	74	1,275
Bhagwanpur	170	702
Bastalwa	100	811
Bahuara	88	705
Tenuni	236	1,342
Basawanpur	13	0
Shahar	216	1,613
Paraspura	36	0
Karwar	131	655
Saitapur	27	0
Loknathpur	144	527
Khoreya	98	749
Chaturbhujpur	65	0
Mangru Sarai	109	0
Jhalkhora	85	1,064
Rasulpur	34	111
Mathia	59	402
Bisodehri	140	269
Baksara	240	2,874
Rampur	90	0
Samhota	77	599
Ismailpur	40	0
Hajipur	49	0
Sohwalia Khurd	98	309
Sohwalia Kalan	116	871
Lakhan Chak	30	0
Baispura	181	1,530
Ratanpura	103	700
Chhitni	127	624
Kolhua	91	0
Gareya	110	988
Checharia	66	0
Bhokhari	308	2,276
Sansardih	74	0
Pathalpura	96	714
Chorha	78	0
Sosna	160	620
Basudhara	83	501
Usana	154	730
Kharhari	230	1,531
Sajandehra	116	1,021
Khutaha	105	0
Khaira	75	0
Akhtiarpur	94	1,073
Manti	229	2,060
Narhanian	55	0
Rivan	154	1,901
Jaruha	112	0
Khajasir	42	0
Dharampura	53	0
Baur	212	1,910
Jogwalia	88	619
Lerha	155	1,063
Baheri	265	1,140
Kharhana	332	1,795
Talia	60	422
Bhawadih	53	414
Garbha	254	1,503
Gori	476	2,378
Gogahra	112	957
Bhaluni	130	761
Bahuara	246	1,047
Jairampah	48	0
Pipri	70	756
Banwalia	34	0
Siri	231	2,100
Bagahi	123	0
Thorsan	135	1,710
Jogipur	143	598
Torni	328	1,640
Phakla	317.7	812
Banaulia	77	91
Phakli	108	1,037
Panapur	73	0
Baradih	71	259
Basdiha	218	1,665
Sagarpur	124	546
Ghordiha	140	1,487
Dhangua	89	498
Bhairawa	100	300
Koriari	141	1,313
Hardaspur	65	0
Mominpur	74	463
Belari	205	1,311
Lankasur	63	0
Mohanpur Kharsani	64	423
Kalyanpur	180	1,480
Meraripur	68	434
Kharagpur Buzurg	58	59
Harnarayanpur	106	589
Maniari	130	731
Ugarsenpur	25	293
Tilkapur	118	1,586
Shahpur	20	0
Belaspur	92	1,210
Manaidih	54	0
Sarodih	100	769
Tilokpur	116	560
Mohanian	359	1,404
Bhaluari	108	1,007
Kharari	581	2,744
Sonbarsa	114	514
Kharagpura	51	406
Mathurapur	120	643
Semaria	113	832
Mathia	16	41
Dumra	288	2,343
Ghuranpur	37	0
Shukulpura	64	888
Delhua	131	1,040
Chilbila	79	644
Panapur	90	1,366
Baradih	99	0
Pipra	282.9	2,712
Shikohabad	66	0
Samdiha	195	1,718
Dalip Chak	19	0
Raghopur	64	258
Machandih	76	721
Narayanpur	77	37
Jalalpur	70	1,659
Sahwalia	25	0
Ambalia	128	778
Kauakhonch	96	1,117
Hirde Sarae	102	328
Sarea	88	334
Harbanspur	31	0
Sahuar	132	2,532
Man Rupaitha	63	31
Rupaitha	69	2,359
Parsupur	57	0
Thorsan	316	1,366
Rampur	171	523
Ghuranpur	120	608
Khanaithi	238	1,556
Jagdatpur	70	894
Pipri	111	718
Basupur	60	527
Kusahi	134	1,154
Bagahi	40	0
Kargahar (block headquarters)	625	10,170
Soni	84.2	989
Bhainsahi	86	0
Nado	118	715
Semri	272	3,169
Lakhanpura	38	795
Itawa	64	0
Sirsia	182	2,778
Garbhe	69	328
Anurudhpur	52	68
Dibhiya	107	1,443
Pirtampur	18	0
Kapatia	59	419
Kishunpur	16	0
Sonbarsa	69	853
Narayanpur	53	147
Parandehra	61	1,006
Patwadih	132	757
Semaria Kanak	167	1,827
Khaira Sahmal	159	1,775
Khaira Dew	267	1,737
Khurhuria	127	1,111
Gokhulpur	49	161
Basantpur	221	961
Chanddehri	72	0
Ratti Chak	74	110
Gopalpur	44	527
Khorhari	55	48
Chandarbhan Patti	335	2,088
Barahri	467	4,413
Rehari	180	1,458
Tenduni	275	1,918
Adain	108	786
Emandehri	122	322
Khairahi	127	974
Sanwabahar	219	892
Akorhi	201	2,780
Maheshpur	153	934
Bishunpura	80	1,024
Larui	99	715
Jalwaia	260	910
Panrepur	93	641
Sirampur	63	0
Tetrarh	85	323
Khakhra	272	1,466
Tenduwa	147	1,126
Senduwar	350	1,967
Semra	75	0
Bhanpur	100	578
Chakardharpur	41	0
Lahuara	81	1,552
Bahuara	136	1,238
Balbhaddarpur	93	467
Panaili	97	1,271
Panaila	96	577
Kamalpur	84	677
Tikari	163	610
Samhauta	189	1,270
Raepur	29	0
Kauwadih	205	1,204
Bhagwanpur	72	435
Deapur	42	0
Larui	94	1,135
Kharui	68	0
Kasigawan	64	0
Chandarbhanpur	147	903
Kusdihra	108	862
Dharahra	99	538
Kutubpur	34	0
Sonadih	176	1,086
Tenua	190	794
Sakraulia	72	0
Parwalia	115	625
Mahuli	127	1,663
Damodarpur	195	956
Pipra	172	1,349
Bahera	94	666
Bisesarpur	40	0
Girdharpur	70	1,089
Gokhulpur	128	888
Sirampur	35	0
Balapur	117	1,010
Aruhi	177	1,644
Rampur	235	3,117
Panjar	261	1,752
Sakhuwan	120	789
Mehmandih	66	0
Babhani	281	4,286
Karup	447	3,303
Pahari	374	2,196
Kusmi	150	246
Gonaila	84	99
