= Nauhatta =

- Village
- Location in Bihar, India Nauhatta (India)
- Coordinates (Nauhatta): 25.9973256°N 86.4807744°E
- Country: India
- State: Bihar
- Region: Mithila
- District: Saharsa
- Elevation: 51 m (167 ft)

Population (2011)
  - Total: 25,347
- Time zone: UTC+05:30 (IST)
- PIN: 852123
- Telephone code: 06478
- ISO 3166 code: IN-BR
- Vehicle registration: BR
- Sex ratio: 931 females per 1000 males ♂/♀ ♂/♀
- Regional Language: Maithili
- Additional languages: Hindi, Urdu

Nauhatta (also pronounced Nowhatta) is a large village in Nauhatta Block in Saharsa District of Bihar state, India. It belongs to Kosi Division . It is located 20 km towards North from District headquarters Saharsa. 165 km from State capital Patna. It comes under Mahisi constituency. The village had a population of 25,347 of which 13,124 were male while 12,223 were females as per Population Census 2011.

== Language, area and population ==
The spoken languages of this village are Hindi, Urdu and Maithili. New generation uses English Language also. Nauhatta village has lower literacy rate compared to Bihar. In 2011, literacy rate of Nauhatta village was 49.62% compared to 61.80% of Bihar. In Nauhatta Male literacy stands at 60.06% while female literacy rate was 38.27%.

It is hot in summer. Nauhatta summer highest day temperature is in between 27 °C to 44 °C . Average temperatures of January is 16 °C, February is 20 °C, March is 27 °C, April is 31 °C, May is 33 °C .

The population is reached by 26000 approx now. Schedule Caste (SC) constitutes 14.50% while Schedule Tribe (ST) were 1.50% of total population in Nauhatta village of Saharsa district. The Nauhatta village population of children with age 0-6 is 4815 which makes up 19.00% of total population of village. Average Sex Ratio of Nauhatta village is 931 which is higher than Bihar state average of 918. Child Sex Ratio for the Nauhatta as per census is 986, higher than Bihar average of 935.

== Economy ==
In Nauhatta village out of total population, 9205 were engaged in work activities. 47.52% of workers describe their work as Main Work (Employment or Earning more than 6 Months) while 52.48% were involved in Marginal activity providing livelihood for less than 6 months. Of 9205 workers engaged in Main Work, 877 were cultivators (owner or co-owner) while 2461 were agricultural labourers.

== Society, religion, and culture ==
The village population consists of many different religious people. The entire village is so well located but this area has also much been affected by the flood of Koshi river. Even in the worst flood of 1984 the main village was not safe and the water entered in the village.

== How to reach Nauhatta ==
- By Rail

There is no railway station near to Nauhatta Block in less than 10km. Saharsa Jn Railway Station (in Saharsa city) is the major railway station of the Kosi Division, Karukhirharnagar Halt Rail Way Station (near to Saharsa) are the Railway stations reachable from nearby towns.

- By Road

Saharsa is the nearest city to Nauhatta. It is connected with road.
