= Chenari, Bihar =

Chenari Chanari
- Census town
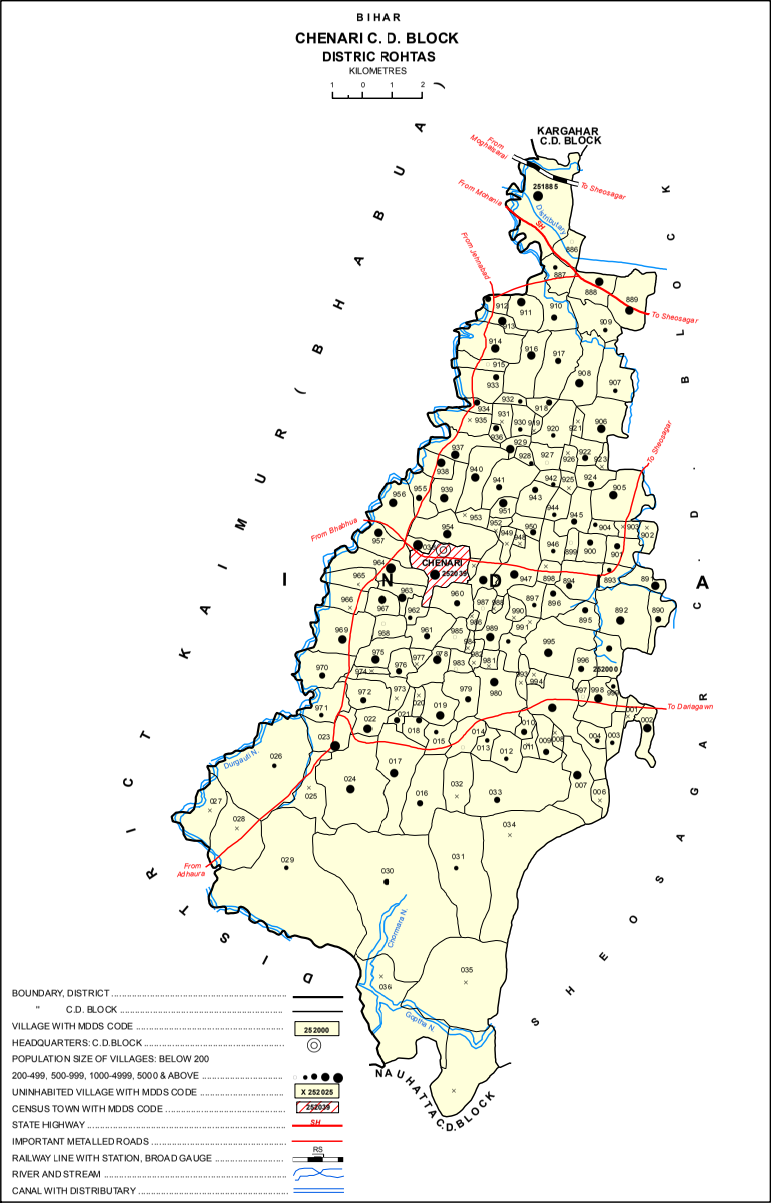

- Location in Bihar, India
- Coordinates: 24.9156°N 83.79684°E
- Country: India
- State: Bihar
- District: Rohtas

Population (2011)
  - Total: 6,569

Languages
  - Official: Hindi
  - Regional: Bhojpuri
- Time zone: UTC+5:30 (IST)
- PIN: 821104

Chenāri or Chanāri is a census town and corresponding community development block in Rohtas district of Bihar, India. As of 2011, the town of Chenari had a population of 6,569, while Chenari block had a population of 131,528. Major commodities produced in the town of Chenari are chironji, rice, and pulses. The census town of Bhardua is administratively counted as part of Chenari block.

== Geography ==
Most of Chenari block lies on the Rohtas plateau, a hilly region that forms an eastern flank of the Vindhya Range. In some parts of the block, the terrain is rugged enough to preclude any large-scale irrigation projects. The town of Chenari covers an area of 2.5 square kilometres, while the block as a whole covers an area of 190.5201 square kilometres.

== History ==
The Shergarh fort, located some 13 km south of Chenari town on a hill overlooking the Durgawati river, was first described in 1813 by Francis Buchanan, who attributed the fort's construction to Sher Shah Suri. More recently, however, P.C. Roy Choudhary has pointed out that the fort is uncharacteristic of Sher Shah's constructions and likely predated his rule. He posits instead that, after capturing nearby Rohtasgarh, Sher Shah repurposed the already-existing fort at Shergarh as a second line of defence, thus giving the fort its current name. The final date of Shergarh's abandonment is unknown.

Chenari was first listed as a census town in 2011.

== Demographics ==
As of 2011, the town of Chenari has a sex ratio of 929 females for every 1000 males, which is the highest among urban centers in Rohtas district. The ratio is lower in the rural parts of Chenari block, with 919 females for every 1000 males; the overall sex ratio of Chenari block is 920, which is about average for Rohtas district. The sex ratio was more equal among 0-6 year olds as of 2011, with 932 girls for every 1000 boys, which was again average in Rohtas. Members of scheduled castes made up 26.82% of the total population of Chenari block (27.42% in rural and 20.71% in urban areas), while members of scheduled tribes constituted 0.83% of the block's population (0.89% in rural and 0.17% in urban areas). The 26.82% scheduled caste membership was highest among all blocks in Rohtas district in 2011. The overall literacy rate of Chenari block as of 2011 was 70.8%; literacy was higher in urban areas than in rural ones, as well as higher in men than in women (80.41% of men but only 60.34% of women could read and write). Both the overall literacy rate and the gender disparity were roughly average for Rohtas district blocks.

== Employment ==
A majority of the workforce of Chenari block was employed in agriculture in 2011. 26.60% of the workforce was employed as cultivators who owned or leased their own land, while 49.18% were agricultural labourers who worked someone else's land for wages. 4.20% of workers were engaged in household industries. The remaining 20.02% were classified as other workers. In the town of Chenari itself, however, the majority of workers were engaged in non-agricultural work. Cultivators formed 3.95% of the workforce, agricultural labourers formed 3.08%, household industry workers formed 20.95%, and other workers formed the remaining 72.01%. The proportion of household industry workers in the town of Chenari was the highest among urban centres in Rohtas district, and the proportion of agricultural labourers was the lowest.

== Amenities ==
Of the 111 inhabited villages in the Chenari block, 51.35% (57 villages) had access to educational facilities in 2011, serving 81.76% of the rural population; both numbers were the lowest among CD blocks in Rohtas district. 7 villages (6.31%) had access to medical facilities, serving 12.63% of the population; both percentages were significantly below the district average. All villages had access to clean drinking water; however, none had access to tap water, with water being supplied instead by well and hand pump. 10 villages had post offices. 54 villages had telephone service, serving 77.93% of the rural population. 52 villages had transport communications (bus, rail, or navigable waterways), and 63 had pucca roads. Seven villages had banks and agricultural credit societies. 79 villages had access to electricity, serving 88.28% of the rural population, which was slightly below the Rohtas district average.

=== Land use ===
In 2011, 66.74 of the district was under cultivation; 76.30% of the cultivated area was irrigated.

== Villages ==
Apart from the census towns of Chenari and Bhardua, Chenari block contains 111 inhabited villages and 42 uninhabited ones, for a total of 153 villages:

Village name	Total land area (hectares)	Population (in 2011)
Khurmabad	569	6,555
Ibrahimpur	93.4	115
Saraiya	108	409
Sabrabad	153	1,576
Tekari	223	2,083
Basantpur	106.8	685
Kenar Khurd	100.4	1,249
Kenar Kalan	316.1	3,404
Sarean	68.1	345
Chandar Kaithi	165.1	971
Bhabhasi	86.7	615
Naraura	89.8	764
Harnagra	87	353
Belahan	58.2	0
Raghunathpur	38.6	138
Barahtali Chhotki	93.1	718
Barahtali Barki	113	969
Jagdishpur	73.6	0
Mahasi	39.7	0
Jag Dehra	43.8	443
Dumri	274	1,040
Langar Kakai	214	1,416
Pia Khurd	151.8	403
Pia Kalan	170.8	1004
Pora	146	472
Chitra Tanr	193	680
Chanhrua	106	1,181
Nakta	44	747
Phulwaria	64	2,811
Telari	161	2,080
Baniadih	96	147
Renria Kalan	176	1,403
Kaithi	209	746
Tenduni	68	637
Tekari	12.1	0
Nuawan	168.3	307
Paharpur	26.8	0
Bijarhi	89	567
Basgitia	26.8	0
Khaira	83.7	938
Kusaha	37.7	0
Dhuraha	42.1	0
Salthua	82.2	120
Mahuat	27.6	233
Ubhawan	61.1	1,027
Dewararh	68.7	423
Garo	62.3	0
Renria Khurd	36.8	201
Shahpur	127.4	991
Gajrarh	61.6	532
Chhotki Malahar	106.9	0
Mathahi	28.4	539
Malahar Kalan	185.4	1,203
Karanpura	80.6	1,344
Charahi	125.1	1,234
Narayanpur	176.8	1,496
Kinarchola	178.9	843
Chaukhara	42.4	370
Dighat	103.2	898
Maura	68.4	290
Bansil	128.7	556
Sahasi	98.7	372
Naraina	197.8	2,353
Sonbarsa	24.3	0
Puraini	45.7	0
Semri	79	582
Dehria	45.7	1,452
Bhataula	36.8	0
Khujha	65.2	0
Hata	267.4	3,072
Birnagar	107.6	595
Lanji	206.4	2,346
Banauli	154.1	2,292
Ghanpura (V)	21.1	0
Pataundha	118.2	1,230
Lodhi	115	998
Datauli	156	717
Katra	46.6	428
Khadauli	68.9	1,629
Pewandi	246.8	5,366
Atraulia	124.6	0
Churesar (V)	102.4	0
Ganeshpur	73.4	1,008
Mugra (V)	82	91
Doia	280.9	1,690
Lohara	213.4	830
Karechh	145.7	399
Nandu Siarha	108.4	610
Mainpura	95	0
Langri (V)	51	0
Tetari	109.7	1,163
Mamrezpur	74.2	682
Rahulia (V)	25.9	0
Ramgarh	135.2	1,239
Turki	168.4	743
Sado Khar	299.1	3,401
Laurpitai (V)	45.7	0
Bharhua	28.4	0
Mahuli	54.2	167
Usra	20.3	0
Chanpura	76.4	146
Kaparpura	25.4	0
Kishunpura	60.8	142
Panapur	15	0
Urda	118.3	1,380
Lachhanpura	39.3	0
Thunhi	46.1	0
Maihaicha	74.1	483
Ghuripur	44.9	0
Karma Digar	46.65	0
Dewadihi	319.3	2,489
Samhauta	95.2	558
Kunrwa	21.85	170
Pilkhi	169.7	2,175
Belaspur	31.76	237
Dihi	137.7	848
Lohari	45.7	0
Pethiawan	110.9	1,597
Sohan Chak	83	315
Pakaria	46.1	268
Khurnu Kalan	309.6	2,379
Chaukhammha	49	0
Magajpura	236	1,019
Naibhui	17.92	0
Neuri	102	701
Khurna	47	566
Bagaicha	43.7	0
Rakba	119	458
Rampur	63.1	479
Gangapur	98.7	102
Jararhi	88	375
Pachaura	290.6	608
Ugahni	349.3	3,829
Paharpur	58.8	619
Bairia	136.4	1,003
Khaira	39.3	0
Chikhuria	66.8	582
Nayakpur	119.9	1,168
Malahipur	172	5,382
Karma	584	1,661
Dafarpur	215.7	0
Badal Garh	724	232
Kota	205.6	0
Shergarh	325.9	0
Urdaga	1339.9	245
Bhurkura	1524.4	527
Auraiya	611.4	458
Bhunda Dih	164.3	0
Tengra	560.4	707
Marpa	731.2	0
Phulwaria	801.3	0
Betari	601	0
Suggikhoh	389.8	0

== See also ==
- Chenari (Vidhan Sabha constituency)
