= Rehal, Rohtas =

Rehal hamlet
- Interactive map of Rehal hamlet
- Country: India
- State: Bihar
- District: Rohtas
- Block: Nauhatta

Rehal is a hamlet situated in Nauhatta block and located in Rohtas district of Bihar, India. It is one of 68 villages in Nauhatta Block along with villages like Bhurwa and Dewadand.
