= Koath =

- Town
- Location in Bihar, India
- Coordinates: 25.32°N 84.27°E
- Country: India
- State: Bihar
- District: Rohtas
- Elevation: 73 m (240 ft)

Population (2001)
  - Total: 15,809

Languages
  - Official: Urdu, Hindi
- Time zone: UTC+5:30 (IST)
- PIN: 802216

Koath is a notified area in Rohtas district in the Indian state of Bihar.

== Geography ==
Koath is located at 25.32°N 84.27°E. It has an average elevation of 73 metres (239 feet).

Koath is far from main highway only approx 3.5 kilometer, Since 1927 it is study center up to high school for local area.

== Demographics ==
As of 2001 India census, Koath had a population of 20,809. Males constitute 52% of the population and females 48%. Koath has an average literacy rate of 48%, lower than the national average of 59.5%: male literacy is 59%, and female literacy is 36%. In Koath, 19% of the population is under 6 years of age.
