= Nokha, Rohtas =

Town in Bihar, India

- Village
- Nickname: Garh nokha
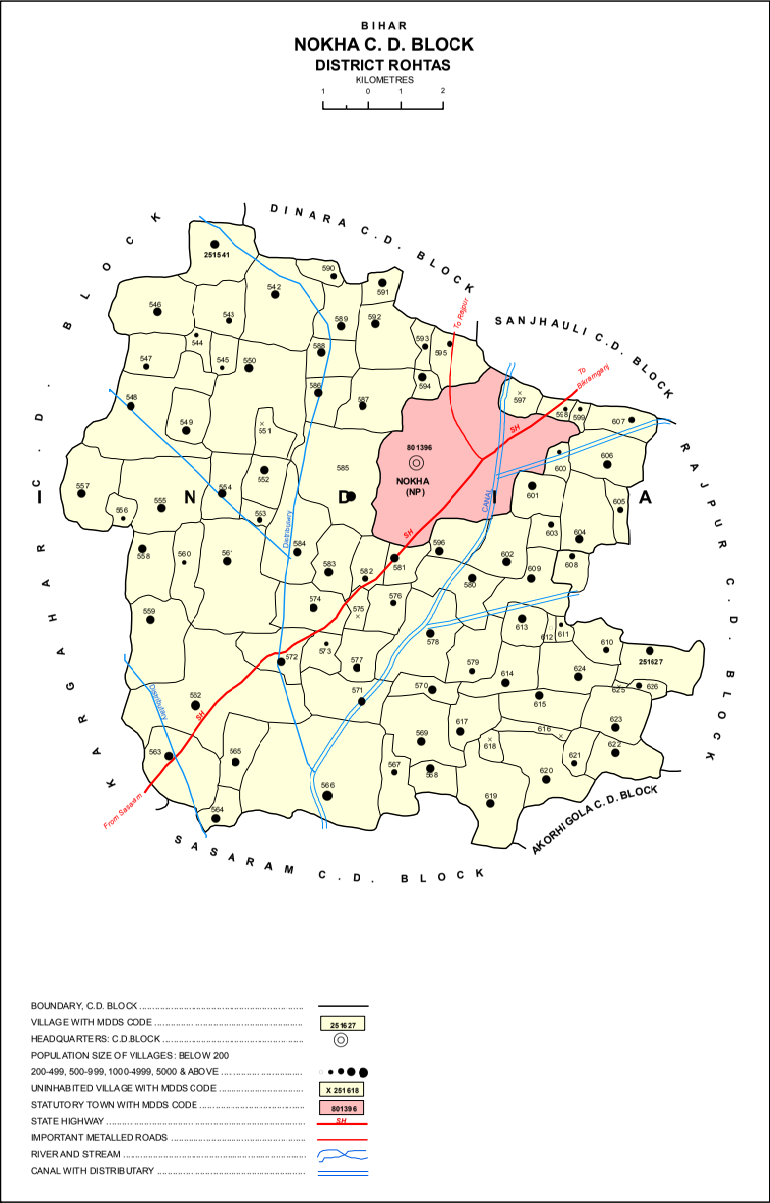

- Location in Bihar, India
- Coordinates: 25.101513°N 84.122756°E
- Country: India
- State: Bihar
- District: Rohtas

Area
  - Total: 13.45 km^{2} (5.19 sq mi)

Population (2011)
  - Total: 27,302
  - Density: 2,030/km^{2} (5,257/sq mi)
- Time zone: UTC+5:30 (IST)
- Website: rohtas.nic.in

Nokha is a nagar panchayat town and corresponding community development block in Rohtas district in the Indian state of Bihar. As of 2011, the population of the town of Nokha was 27,302 in 4,381 households. The rural population of Nokha block was 146,025, thus bringing the total block population 173,327. The economic situation of this region is mainly dependent on parboiled rice processed by number of rice mills in this area.

== Geography ==
The entire block of Nokha is situated on the Sasaram Plain. Nokha block contains 15,267 hectares, of which 90.22% is cultivable; of the cultivable area, 83.85% is irrigated. The total area of the town of Nokha is 13.45 square kilometers.

== Demographics ==
As of 2011, the town of Nokha had a population of 27,302. The total population of Nokha block, including urban and rural population, was 173,327.

=== Population history ===
The 1991 Indian census recorded a population of 16,350 for Nokha town. In 2001, the population was 22,354, representing a 36.7% increase in the last decade. In 2011, the population of 27,302 marked a ten-year growth rate of 22.1%.

The rural population of Nokha block was 123,408 in 2001. This increased to 146,025 as of the 2011 Census, representing an 18.3% increase. For the block as a whole, rural and urban, the population increased from 145,762 in 2011 to 173,327 in 2011, an 18.9% increase.

=== Sex ratio ===
The sex ratio of the town of Nokha was 897 females to every 1000 males. In rural parts of Nokha block, the sex ratio was higher, with 917 females to every 1000 males; the overall sex ratio of Nokha block was 914. All three ratios were about average for their respective category in Rohtas district. In the 0-6 age bracket, the sex ratios were more equal: Nokha town's was 899, while the ratio among rural villages was 945, bringing the overall block ratio to 938. The rural 0-6 sex ratio was somewhat higher than the district average of 933, but the urban ratio was lower than the district average of 914.

=== Scheduled castes and scheduled tribes membership ===
The total scheduled castes population of Nokha district was 31,787 (18.34% of the total population), with 3,453 of them living in Nokha town (12.65%). The percentage of the population belonging to scheduled castes was roughly average for Rohtas district. Scheduled tribes population was substantially lower: only 174 people belonged to scheduled tribes in the entire district, with 5 of them residing in Nokha town.

=== Literacy ===
The literacy rate of Nokha town was 75.69% in 2011, which was roughly average among Rohtas district's towns. Literacy was higher in men than in women: 84.33% of men but only 66.04% of women could read and write, the corresponding gender gap of 18.29% was slightly higher than the urban average of 13.33% for Rohtas. Literacy was lower in rural areas, with 72.37% of the rural population of Nokha block literate; overall, the block's literacy rate was 72.9%.

=== Employment ===
In Nokha block, 22.01% of the workforce was employed as cultivators who owned or leased their own land. 45.87% were agricultural labourers, who worked someone else's land for money. 4.41% were household industry workers, and the remaining 27.71% were classed as other workers. These proportions were all roughly average for Rohtas district. In the town of Nokha, however, most of the workforce was engaged in non-agricultural work, with only 10.73% being cultivators and 17.83% being agricultural labourers. 8.75% was engaged in household industries, and 62.69% were other workers.

== Economy ==
The 2011 census listed the three most important commodities in Nokha town as rice, furniture, and bricks.

Nokha is small city in Rohtas district of Bihar. It is famous in Bihar as a major centre for production of parboiled rice through the number of rice mills. Rice mills used to be major part in its economy. People living here are totally dependent on agriculture for bread and butter. There are multiple schools and colleges, still the level of education is not that much. Students have to migrate to other cities (mainly Patna) to get quality education.

== Climate ==
The climate of the region is sub-tropical and typical of the plains of Northern India, with hot dry summers and cool winters with cold nighttime temperatures. The monsoon is vital for the district as the economy is mainly based on agriculture.

Deforestation has led to climate change and has had an environmental impact, with drought becoming more frequent and temperatures becoming warmer. As recently as the early 1990s, nighttime frost used to be common in the winter, however deforestation in the Kaimur hills has had a negative impact.

== Transport ==
Nokha is connected with a small railway station to the major cities of Bihar, including the capital city, Patna. This place also is well connected with the road, as the SH-12 passes through Nokha.

== Education ==
As of 2011, the town of Nokha was home to 8 primary schools, 5 middle schools, 5 secondary schools, 1 senior secondary school, and 1 college.

== Villages ==
Nokha block contains 87 villages (81 inhabited and 6 uninhabited), not counting Nokha itself.

Village name	Total land area (hectares)	Population (in 2011)
Dharampura	252	2,570
Majrarh	369	2,918
Singwa Dharampur	165	685
Parsia	49	296
Parsia Nisf	51	456
Kaithi	280	1,663
Panrwa	136	829
Nonsari	493	3,410
Bhikharidih	134	1,050
Sisrit	541	4,368
Pauni	96	0
Jabra	111	2,224
Salempur	44	558
Baligawan	169	1,070
Tilai	343	1,922
Faridpur	49	492
Badjoga	244	2,178
Rupahtha	207	1,838
Bishanpura	286	1,940
Nawadih	163	255
Hathni	487	3,484
Barawan	796	11,427
Kharari	304	1,820
Biseni Khurd	86	2,192
Shivpur	144	1,266
Kadwa	837	11,402
Nawadih	136	960
Meyari	94	1,343
Kuri	255	2,914
Mani	140	1,969
Maudiha	253	2,369
Chanka	86	1,084
Jakhani	175	335
Penar	195	1,646
Rampur Gazi	46	0
Kusahi	113	729
Rampur	130	1,791
Sisirta	316	2,934
Bhawandihri	168	903
Pipra	238	2,656
Gopalpur	98	1,604
Gangahar	108	757
Tarar	165	1,638
Dharupur	297	2,548
Ghusia	478	6,418
Charnarh	120	2,006
Bhaunra	268	2,595
Dudhar	120	1,600
Gamharia	151	1,358
Baradih	71	812
Hasnadih	77	1,391
Sotawan	2000008	2,354
Sitalpur	43	527
Tendua	51	1,094
Dera	161	684
Sariawan	140	1,680
Kusaha	67	0
Ram Nagar	55	373
Akrahia	33	300
Ghetarua	55	435
Dumra	133	1,481
Sirkhinda	155	2,865
Chhabilapur	67	863
Ghurdihan	226	1,329
Bishambharpur	64	512
Chhatauna	223	1,545
Bhatauli	115	818
Rampur	80	925
Gosainpur	197	1,500
Karan	127	998
Milki	32	267
Misrauli	24	120
Karma	123	1,122
Khairahan	166	1,443
Pach Pakhri	180	1,995
Chorpokhar	38	0
Gamharia	140	1,055
Salempur	39	0
Lilari	329	2,617
Majhiyawan	268	2,196
Itawa	83	658
Bhaon	173	1,981
Chanki	185	2,075
Naran	204	1,060
Karmahi	11	0
Pachahar	49	571
Eghara	186	1,909
