= National Grid (India) =

Electricity transmission network in India

The 5 regional power grids in India, which were interconnected to establish the National Grid.

The National Grid is the high-voltage electricity transmission network in India, connecting power stations and major substations and ensuring that electricity generated anywhere in India can be used to satisfy demand elsewhere. The National Grid is owned, and maintained by state-owned Power Grid Corporation of India and operated by state-owned Power System Operation Corporation. It is one of the largest operational synchronous grids in the world with 500 GW of installed power generation capacity as of 30 June 2025.

India's grid is connected as a wide area synchronous grid nominally running at 50 Hz. The permissible range of the frequency band is 49.5-50.5 Hz, effective 17 September 2012. The Union Government regulates grid frequency by requiring States to pay more when they draw power at low frequencies. There are also synchronous interconnections to Bhutan, and asynchronous links with Bangladesh, Myanmar, and Nepal. An undersea interconnection to Sri Lanka (India–Sri Lanka HVDC Interconnection) has also been proposed. A proposed interconnection between Myanmar and Thailand would facilitate the creation of a power pool and enable trading among all BIMSTEC nations.

== History ==
India began utilizing grid management on a regional basis in the 1960s. Individual State grids were interconnected to form 5 regional grids covering mainland India. The grids were the Northern, Eastern, Western, North Eastern and Southern Grids. These regional links were established to enable transmission of surplus electricity between States in each region. In the 1990s, the Indian government began planning for a national grid. Regional grids were initially interconnected by asynchronous HVDC back-to-back links facilitating limited exchange of regulated power. The links were subsequently upgraded to high capacity synchronous links.

The first interconnection of regional grids was established in October 1991 when the North Eastern and Eastern grids were interconnected. The Western Grid was interconnected with the aforementioned grids in March 2003. The Northern grid was also interconnected in August 2006, forming a Central Grid synchronously connected operating at one frequency. The sole remaining regional grid, the Southern Grid, was synchronously interconnected to the Central Grid on 31 December 2013 with the commissioning of the 765 kV Raichur-Solapur transmission line, thereby establishing the National Grid.

== Territories outside the grid ==
The union territories of Andaman and Nicobar Islands and Lakshadweep are not connected to the National Grid. Both territories are archipelagos located far away from the mainland. Due to the geography and topography of these islands, including separation by sea over great distances, there is no single power grid for all the electrified islands in the archipelago. The power generation and distribution systems of these territories is served by standalone systems, with each electrified island in the archipelago having its own generation and distribution system. Power stations cater independently to the power requirements of an area. The Electricity Department of Andaman and Nicobar (EDA&N) and the Lakshadweep Electricity Department (LED) are responsible for generation, transmission and distribution systems in these territories.

== Inter regional transmission capacity ==
The inter regional total transmission capacity (TTC) is 105,050 MW as on 30 June 2021. However the available transmission capacity (ATC) on daily basis is not exceeding 35% of TTC and the actual usage is around 25%. Due to inter regional transmission constraints, the cost of power purchases by every region in Power Exchanges is not always equal. MoP has introduced a policy for nationwide single merit order power purchases from Power exchanges to avoid costly power purchases by the Discoms.

== Cross border transmission links ==
India began cross-border electricity trade in the mid-1980s. India established 33 kV and 132 kV interconnections in radial mode from Bihar and Uttar Pradesh to Bhutan and Nepal respectively. The first interconnection with Bangladesh was commissioned in December 2013, connecting Berhampore with Bheramara. As of April 2017, there are 12 cross-border interconnections between India and Nepal. India became a net exporter of electricity for the first time in the 2016-17 fiscal year.

Presently, India is importing electricity from Bhutan with synchronous transmission links while exporting power to Nepal, Bangladesh and Myanmar with asynchronous transmission links between the National Grid and the electricity grids of these countries. India is planning to build a minimum of 125 GW of wind capacity for Nepal 10 GW of hydro capacity for Nepal 20 GW of nuclear capacity and an undetermined amount of solar capacity by 2050 with full financial ownership in the hands of Nepal.

== See also ==
- Electricity sector in India
- Availability-based tariff
