= Rohtas district =

District in Bihar, India

- District of Bihar
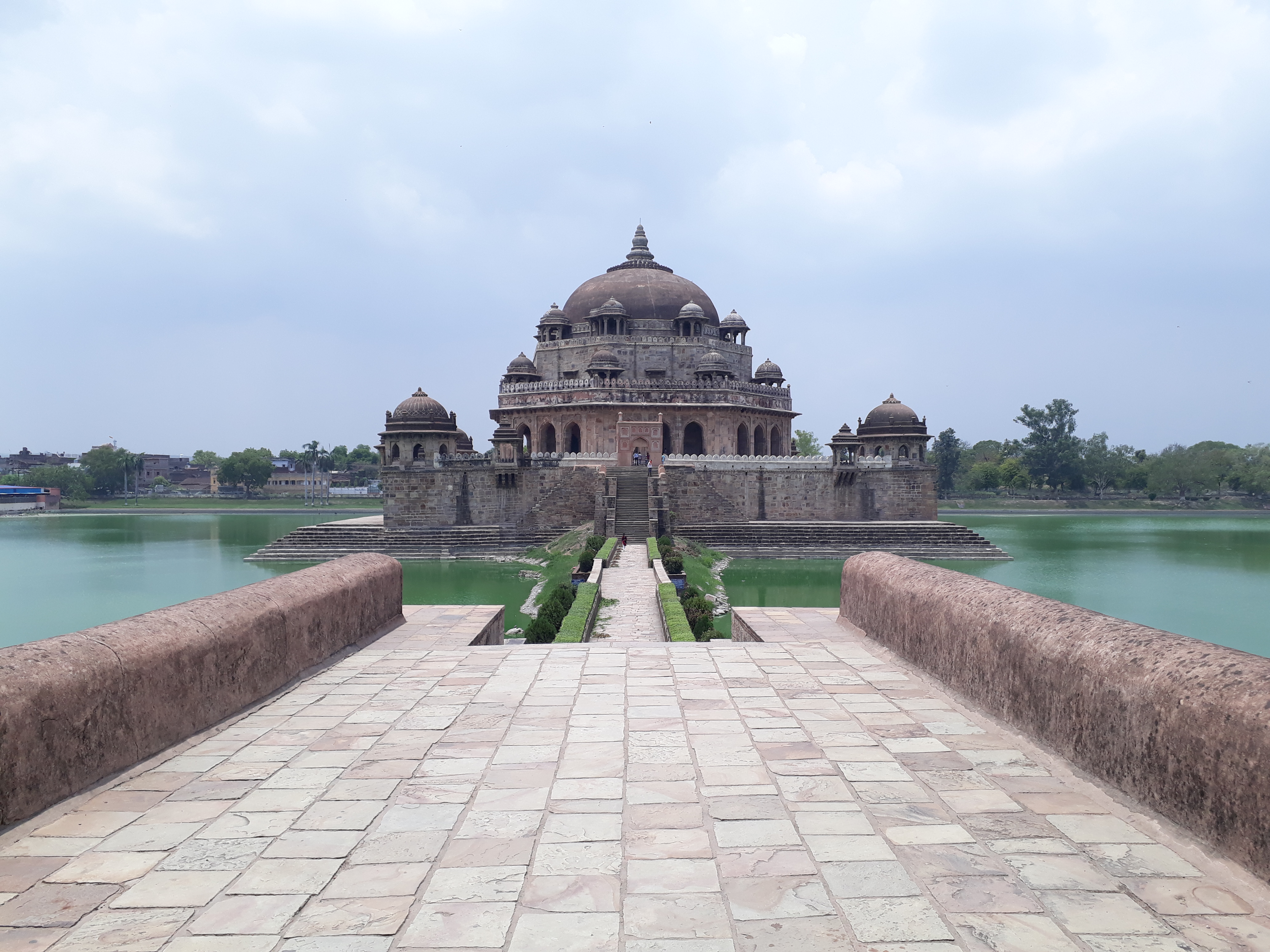
- Tomb of Sher Shah Suri

- Location of Rohtas district in Bihar
- Country: India
- State: Bihar
- Region: Bhojpur
- Division: Patna
- Headquarters: Sasaram

Government
  - Lok Sabha constituencies: Sasaram, Karakat, Buxar
  - District Magistrate: Udita Singh, Indian Administrative Service
  - Superintendent of Police: Raushan Kumar, Indian Police Service
  - Divisional Forest Officer: Manish Kumar Verma, Indian Forest Service

Area
  - Total: 3,847.82 km^{2} (1,485.65 sq mi)

Population (2011)
  - Total: 2,959,918
  - Density: 769.245/km^{2} (1,992.34/sq mi)

Demographics
  - Literacy: 90.2% (2024)
  - Sex ratio: 914

Languages
  - Official: Hindi; English; Bhojpuri
- Time zone: UTC+05:30 (IST)
- PIN: 821115 (Rohtas)
- ISO 3166 code: 06188
- Vehicle registration: BR 24
- Major highways: NH 2
- Website: Official District Website

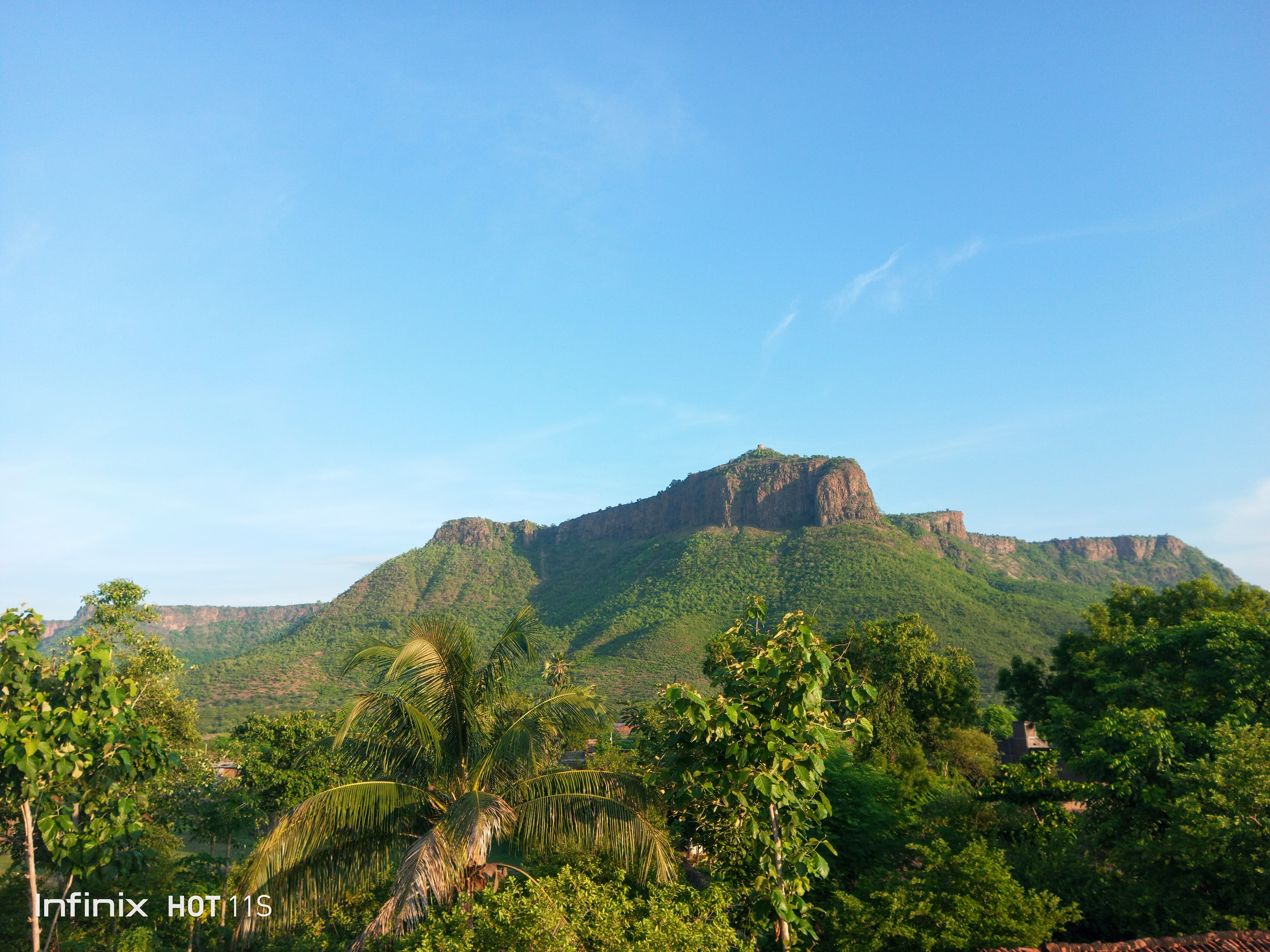
Rohtas Plateau, an extension of the Vindhya formation, is abundant in limestone and shales, providing raw materials to the local cement industry.

Rohtas district also spelled as Rautas, is one of the thirty-eight districts of Bihar state, India. It came into existence when Shahabad District was bifurcated into Bhojpur and Rohtas in 1972. Administrative headquarter of the district is Sasaram. Rohtas district has the highest literacy in Bihar. The literacy rate of Rohtas district which is 73.37% as per 2011 census is highest among all 38 districts of Bihar.

Rohtas district also has one of the highest forest cover among all 38 districts of Bihar.

The Rohtas district is a part of Patna Division, and it has an area of 3850 km², a population of 2,959,918 (2011 census), and a population density of 763 persons per km². Languages spoken here are Bhojpuri, Hindi and English.

== History ==
Rohtas district was created in 1972, when the former Shahabad district was divided in two. It corresponded to the former district's sub-divisions of Sasaram and Bhabua. In 1991, Bhabua was split off as a separate district, which was renamed Kaimur district in 1994.

The district is a part of the Red Corridor.

== Geography ==
Rohtas district covers an area of 3,851 square kilometres (1,487 sq mi). This makes it the 4th-largest district in Bihar.

Rohtas district can be divided into two major natural areas. In the north and northeast is the Sasaram Plain, an alluvial plain sloping gently downward toward the northeast. Its average height ranges from 72m above sea level in the north to 153m above sea level in the south. The plains cover all of Dinara, Dawath, Bikramganj, Nasriganj, Nokha, and Dehri Blocks, as well as parts of Sasaram, Sheosagar, and Rohtas Blocks. There are scattered woodlands in the east, in Sasaram Block. In the southern part of the district is the Rohtas Plateau, which is an eastern flank of the Vindhya plateau with an average elevation of 300m above sea level. It covers parts of Nauhatta, Rohtas, Sheosagar, Sasaram, and Chenari Blocks. This area is hilly, with occasional forests throughout. Several streams flow toward the north, including the Durgawati, the Bajari, the Koel, and the Sura. The Rohtas Plateau is less well suited for agriculture due to the uneven, rocky and gravelly soils as well as the forest cover. A variety of long grasses grow naturally on the plateau, including pear grass, kus, and khas khas.

Throughout Rohtas district, the soils are generally classified as ustalfs, ochrepts, orthents, fluvents, and psamments.

=== List of Hills ===
- Murli Hill

== Economy ==
Economy of the district is agriculture based. Rice, wheat and maize are the main crops. Rohtas is also called the "Rice bowl of Bihar". Until 1980, Dalmianagar was one of the major industrial cities in India. It had sugar, vegetable oil, cement, paper, and chemical factories but now they are closed.

In 2006 the Ministry of Panchayati Raj named Rohtas one of the country's 250 most backward districts (out of a total of 640). It is one of the 36 districts in Bihar have received funds from the Backward Regions Grant Fund Programme (BRGF).

== Places of interest ==
- "Kaimur Wildlife Sanctuary", Natural wildlife
- "Shershah's Tomb", A Historical monument
- "Dhua Kund", Natural Water Fall
- "Rohtas Garh Fort", Historical Fort
- "Maa Tara Chandi Temple", Devi Shaktipeeth Temple
- "Gupta Dham", a cave Temple.

== Demographics ==
Historical population
| Year | Pop. | ±% p.a. |
|---|---|---|
| 1901 | 606,016 | — |
| 1911 | 575,964 | −0.51% |
| 1921 | 560,894 | −0.26% |
| 1931 | 616,315 | +0.95% |
| 1941 | 719,901 | +1.57% |
| 1951 | 831,133 | +1.45% |
| 1961 | 1,024,133 | +2.11% |
| 1971 | 1,286,983 | +2.31% |
| 1981 | 1,583,280 | +2.09% |
| 1991 | 1,927,736 | +1.99% |
| 2001 | 2,464,243 | +2.49% |
| 2011 | 2,959,918 | +1.85% |

Religions in Rohtas district (2011)
| Religion | Percent |
| Hinduism | 89.37% |
| Islam | 10.15% |
| Other or not stated | 0.48% |

According to the 2011 census Rohtas district has a population of 2,959,918, roughly equal to the nation of Armenia or the US state of Mississippi. This gives it a ranking of 127th in India (out of a total of 640). In Bihar, it is ranked 17th out of 38 in terms of population. The district has a population density of 763 inhabitants per square kilometre (1,980/sq mi), ranking 34th out of 38 in Bihar (the state's density is 1,106 inhabitants per square kilometre (2,860/sq mi). Its population growth rate over the decade 2001–2011 was 20.22%. Rohtas has a sex ratio of 918 females for every 1000 males, which ranks 22nd out of 38 in Bihar (the state ratio is also 918). 14.45% of the population live in urban areas. Scheduled Castes and Scheduled Tribes make up 18.57% and 1.07% of the population respectively.

The literacy rate in Rohtas district was 73.37% as of 2011 which is highest among all 38 districts of Bihar. The literacy rate was higher for men than for women: 82.88% of men but only 62.97% of women in the district could read and write. Literacy also was higher in urban areas than rural ones. The highest literacy rate in Rohtas district could be found in the town and sub-district of Dehri - 77.70% of the district's total population, and 81.2% of the population of the town proper, was literate. The lowest literacy rate was in the entirely rural CD block of Nauhatta, where 63.07% of the population could read and write.

A majority of the working population of Rohtas district was employed in agriculture in 2011, with 23.58% being cultivators who owned or rented their own land and 43.85% being agricultural laborers who worked someone else's land for wages. Another 5.25% of the district's workforce was employed in household industries, and all other forms of employment accounted for the remaining 27.33%.

=== Languages ===
Languages in Rohtas district (2011)
1. Bhojpuri (87.7%)
2. Hindi (7.47%)
3. Urdu (4.38%)
4. Others (0.48%)

At the time of the 2011 Census of India, 87.67% of the population in the district spoke Bhojpuri, 7.47% Hindi and 4.39% Urdu as their first language.

== Flora and fauna ==
In 1982 Rohtas district became home to the Kaimur Wildlife Sanctuary, which has an area of 1,342 km^{2} (518.1 mi^{2}).

== Administration ==
The Rohtas district (headquartered at Sasaram) is headed by an IAS officer of the rank of District Magistrate (DM).

The district has got 2072 villages under 226 Gram Panchayats, 34 territorial police stations

=== Tehsils ===
Rohtas district comprises three tehsils or Sub-divisions, each headed by a Sub-Divisional Magistrate (SDM):

1. Sasaram
2. Bikramganj
3. Dehri

=== Blocks ===
These tehsils are further divided into 19 blocks, each headed by a block development officer (BDO).

1. Akorhi Gola
2. Bikramganj
3. Chenari
4. Dawath
5. Dehri
6. Dinara
7. Karakat
8. Kargahar
9. Kochas
10. Nasriganj
11. Nauhatta
12. Nokha
13. Rajpur
14. Rohtas
15. Sanjhauli
16. Sasaram
17. Sheosagar
18. Suryapura
19. Tilauthu

There are 10 towns in Rohtas district, as follows:

| Town name | Class | Population (in 2011) |
|---|---|---|
| Koath | Nagar panchayat | 18,890 |
| Bikramganj | Nagar panchayat | 48,465 |
| Nasriganj | Nagar panchayat | 23,819 |
| Nokha | Nagar panchayat | 27,302 |
| Bhardua | Census town | 5,317 |
| Chanari | Census town | 6,569 |
| Sasaram | Nagar Nigam | 147,408 |
| Dehri | Nagar parishad | 137,231 |
| Saraiya | Census town | 8,260 |
| Telkap | Census town | 4,504 |
| Karagahar | Census town | 10,170 |

== Politics ==
| District | No. | Constituency | Name | Party | Alliance | Remarks |
|---|---|---|---|---|---|---|
| Rohtas | 207 | Chenari (SC) | Murari Prasad Gautam | LJP(RV) | NDA | |
| Rohtas | 208 | Sasaram | Snehlata Kushwaha | RLM | NDA | |
| Rohtas | 209 | Kargahar | Bashisth Singh | JD(U) | NDA | |
| Rohtas | 210 | Dinara | Alok Kumar Singh | RLM | NDA | |
| Rohtas | 211 | Nokha | Nagendra Chandravanshi | JD(U) | NDA | |
| Rohtas | 212 | Dehri | Rajeev Ranjan Singh | LJP(RV) | NDA | |
| Rohtas | 213 | Karakat | Arun Singh Kushwaha | CPI(ML)L | MGB | |

== Notable people ==
- Sher Shah Suri, Emperor of India, conquered the Mughal Empire, defeating 2nd Mughal emperor Humayun.
- Chhedi Paswan, former Member of Parliament, ex-MLA
- Sanjay Nirupam, Ex-Member of Parliament Mumbai North, Ex-Member of Parliament, Rajya Sabha
- Murari Prasad Gautam, Ex-Minister in Eighth Nitish ministry
- Vijay Kumar, Renowned biologist
- Akash Deep, Indian cricketer, a squad member of Royal Challengers Bangalore in Indian Premier League.
- Ritesh Pandey, Bhojpuri actor and singer
- Kavi Kumar Azad, famous for his role in TV serial Taarak Mehta Ka Ooltah Chashmah as Dr. Hansraj Hathi
- Jyoti Prakash Nirala, recipient of Ashok Chakra posthumously in 2018
