= List of districts of Bihar =

Districts of Bihar.

Bihar, a state of India, currently has 38 administrative districts, 101 subdivisions (अनुमंडल) and 534 CD blocks.

== Administration ==
Administrative Division in Details
Divisions	9
Districts	38
Subdivisions	109
Cities and towns	207
Blocks	534
Villages	45,103
Panchayats	8,406
Police Districts	43
Police Stations	853

A district of an Indian state is an administrative geographical unit, headed by a district magistrate or a deputy commissioner, an officer belonging to the Indian Administrative Service. The district magistrate or the deputy commissioner is assisted by a number of officials belonging to different wings of the administrative services of the state.

A superintendent of police, an officer belonging to Indian Police Service, is entrusted with the responsibility of maintaining law and order and related issues.

3 to 6 districts are comprised to form a division (प्रमंडल). Each district is divided into sub-divisions (अनुमंडल), which are further sub-divided into CD blocks (प्रखण्ड).

== List ==
=== Existing districts ===
Note: These densities don't agree with the populations and areas.

No.	Code	District Name	District Headquarters	C.D. Blocks	Population (2011)	Area (km^{2})	Density (/km^{2}) (2011)	Map
1	AR	Araria	Araria	Araria; Bhargama; Forbesganj; Jokihat; Kursa Kanta; Narpatganj; Palasi; Raniganj; Sikti	2,811,569	2,829	994	
2	AW	Arwal	Arwal	Arwal; Kaler; Karpi; Kurtha; Sonbhadra Banshi Suryapur	699,000	637	1,097	
3	AU	Aurangabad	Aurangabad	Aurangabad; Barun; Daudnagar; Deo; Goh; Haspura; Kutumba; Madanpur; Nabinagar; Obra; Rafiganj	2,540,073	3,303	769	
4	BA	Banka	Banka	Amarpur; Banka; Barahat; Belhar; Bounsi; Chandan; Dhoraiya; Fullidumar; Katoria; Rajoun; Sambhuganj	2,034,763	3,018	674	
5	BE	Begusarai	Begusarai	Bachhwara; Bakhri; Balia; Barauni; Begusarai; Bhagwanpur; Birpur; Cheria Bariarpur; Chhorahi; Dandari; Garhpura; Khodawandpur; Mansurchak; Matihani; Naokothi; Sahebpur Kamal; Samho Akha Kurha; Teghra	2,970,541	1,917	1,550	
6	BG	Bhagalpur	Bhagalpur	Bihpur; Gopalpur; Goradih; Ismailpur; Jagdishpur; Kahalgaon; Kharik; Narayanpur; Nathnagar; Naugachhia; Pirpainti; Rangra Chowk; Sabour; Sanhaula; Shahkund; Sultanganj	3,037,766	2,569	1,182	
7	BJ	Bhojpur	Arrah	Arrah; Agiaon; Barhara; Bihiya; Charpokhari; Garhani; Jagdishpur; Koilwar; Piro; Sahar; Sandesh; Shahpur; Tarari; Udwantnagar	2,728,407	2,473	1,103	
8	BU	Buxar	Buxar	Buxar; Brahmapur; Chakki; Chausa; Chaugain; Dumraon; Itarhi; Kesath; Nawanagar; Rajpur; Simri	1,706,352	1,624	1,051	
9	DA	Darbhanga	Darbhanga	Alinagar; Bahadurpur; Baheri; Benipur; Biraul; Darbhanga Sadar; Gaura Bauram; Ghanshyampur; Hanuman Nagar; Hayaghat; Jale; Keoti; Kiratpur; Kusheshwar Asthan East; Kusheshwar Asthan; Manigachhi; Singhwara; Tardih	3,937,385	2,278	1,728	
10	EC	East Champaran	Motihari	Adapur; Areraj; Banjaria; Bankatwa; Chakia; Chiraiya; Dhaka; Ghorasahan; Harsidhi; Kalyanpur; Kesaria; Kotwa; Madhuban; Mehsi; Motihari; Narkatia; Paharpur; Pakri Dayal; Patahi; Phenhara; Piprakothi; Ramgarhwa; Raxaul; Sangrampur; Sugauli; Tetaria; Turkaulia	5,099,371	3,969	1,285	
11	GA	Gaya	Gaya	Gaya Town; Amas; Atri; Banke Bazar; Barachatti; Bathani; Belaganj; Bodh Gaya; Dobhi; Dumaria; Fatehpur; Guraru; Gurua; Imamganj; Khizirsarai; Konch; Manpur; Mohanpur; Muhra; Paraiya; Sherghati; Tan Kuppa; Tekari; Wazirganj	4,391,418	4,978	882	
12	GO	Gopalganj	Gopalganj	Baikunthpur; Barauli; Bhorey; Bijaipur; Gopalganj; Hathua; Katiya; Kuchaikote; Manjha; Pach Deuri; Phulwaria; Sidhwalia; Thawe; Uchkagaon	2,562,012	2,033	1,260	
13	JA	Jamui	Jamui	Barhat; Chakai; Gidhour; Islampur Aliganj; Jamui; Jhajha; Khaira; Laxmipur; Sikandra; Sono	1,760,405	3,099	568	
14	JE	Jehanabad	Jehanabad	Ghoshi; Hulasganj; Jehanabad; Kako; Makhdumpur; Modanganj; Ratni Faridpur	1,125,313	1,569	717	
15	KH	Khagaria	Khagaria	Alauli; Baldaur; Chautham; Gogri; Khagaria; Mansi; Parbatta	1,666,886	1,486	1,122	
16	KI	Kishanganj	Kishanganj	Bahadurganj; Dighalbank; Kishanganj; Kochadhaman; Pothia; Terhagachh; Thakurganj	1,690,400	1,884	897	
17	KM	Kaimur	Bhabua	Adhaura; Bhabua; Bhagwanpur; Chainpur; Chand; Durgawati; Kudra; Mohania; Nuaon; Ramgarh; Rampur	1,626,384	3,363	484	
18	KT	Katihar	Katihar	Amdabad; Azamnagar; Balrampur; Barari; Barsoi; Dandkhora; Falka; Hasanganj; Kadwa; Katihar; Korha; Kursela; Manihari; Mansahi; Pranpur; Sameli	3,071,029	3,056	1,005	
19	LA	Lakhisarai	Lakhisarai	Barahiya; Chanan; Halsi; Lakhisarai; Pipariya; Ramgarh Chowk; Surajgarha	1,000,912	1,229	814	
20	MB	Madhubani	Madhubani	Andhra Tharhi; Babubarhi; Basopatti; Benipatti; Bisfi; Ghoghardiha; Harlakhi; Jainagar; Jhanjharpur; Kaluahi; Khajauli; Ladania; Lakhnaur; Laukahi; Madhwapur; Madhubani; Pandaul; Phulparas; Rahika; Rajnagar	4,487,379	3,501	1,282	
21	MG	Munger	Munger	Asarganj; Bariarpur; Dharhara; Haveli Kharagpur; Jamalpur; Munger; Sangrampur; Tarapur; Tetia Bambar	1,367,765	1,419	964	
22	MP	Madhepura	Madhepura	Alamnagar; Bihariganj; Chousa; Gamhariya; Ghelardh; Gwalpara; Kumarkhand; Madhepura; Murliganj; Puraini; Shankarpur; Singheshwar; Udakishunganj	2,001,762	1,787	1,120	
23	MZ	Muzaffarpur	Muzaffarpur	Aurai Block; Bandra; Bochaha; Gaighat; Kanti; Katra; Kurhani; Marwan; Minapur; Muraul (Dholi); Motipur; Musahri; Paroo; Sahebganj; Sakra; Saraiya	4,801,062	3,173	1,513	
24	NL	Nalanda	Bihar Sharif	Asthawan; Bena; Biharsharif; Bind; Chandi; Ekangarsarai; Giriyak; Harnaut; Hilsa; Islampur; Karai Parsurai; Katrisarai; Nagarnausa; Noorsarai; Parwalpur; Rahui; Rajgir; Sarmera; Silao; Tharthari	2,877,653	2,354	1,222	
25	NW	Nawada	Nawada	Akbarpur; Govindpur; Hisua; Kashichak; Kawakol; Meskaur; Nardiganj; Narhat; Nawada; Pakribarawan; Rajauli; Roh; Sirdala; Warisaliganj	2,219,146	2,492	891	
26	PA	Patna	Patna	Patna Sadar; Athmalgola; Bakhtiarpur; Barh; Belchi; Bihta; Bikram; Danapur; Daniyawan; Dhanarua; Dulhin Bazar; Fatuha; Ghoswari; Khusrupur; Maner; Masaurhi; Mokama; Naubatpur; Paliganj; Pandarak; Phulwari Sharif; Punpun; Sampatchak	5,838,465	3,202	1,823	
27	PU	Purnia	Purnia	Amour; Baisa; Baisi; Banmankhi; Barhara Kothi; Bhawanipur Rajdham; Dagarua; Dhamdaha; Jalalgarh; Kasba; Krityanand Nagar; Purnia East; Rupauli; Srinagar	3,264,619	3,228	1,011	
28	RO	Rohtas	Sasaram	Akorhi Gola; Bikramganj; Chenari; Dawath; Dehri; Dinara; Karakat; Kargahar; Kochas; Nasriganj; Nauhatta; Nokha; Rajpur; Rohtas; Sanjhauli; Sasaram; Sheosagar; Suryapura; Tilauthu	2,959,918	3,850	769	
29	SH	Saharsa	Saharsa	Banma Itahri; Kahara; Mahishi; Nauhatta; Patarghat; Salkhua; Sattar Kataiya; Sour Bazar; Simri Bakhtiyarpur; Sonbarsa	1,900,661	1,702	1,117	
30	SM	Samastipur	Samastipur	Bibhutipur; Bithan; Dalsing Sarai; Hasanpur; Kalyanpur; Khanpur; Mohanpur; Mohiuddin Nagar; Morwa; Patori; Pusa; Rosera; Samastipur; Sarairanjan; Shivajinagar; Singhiya; Tajpur; Ujiyarpur; Vidyapati Nagar; Warishnagar	4,261,566	2,905	1,467	
31	SO	Sheohar	Sheohar	Dumri Katsari; Piprahi; Purnahiya; Sheohar; Tariani Chowk	656,246	349	1,880	
32	SP	Sheikhpura	Sheikhpura	Ariari; Barbigha; Chewara; Ghat Kusumbha; Sheikhpura; Shekhopur Sarai	634,927	689	922	
33	SR	Saran	Chhapra	Amnour; Baniapur; Chhapra; Dariyapur; Dighwara; Ekma; Garkha; Ishupur; Jalalpur; Lahladpur; Maker; Manjhi; Marhaura; Mashrakh; Nagra; Panapur; Parsa; Revelganj; Sonpur; Taraiya	3,951,862	2,641	1,496	
34	ST	Sitamarhi	Dumra	Bairgania; Bajpatti; Bathnaha; Belsand; Bokhra; Choraut; Dumra; Majorganj; Nanpur; Parihar; Parsauni; Pupri; Riga; Runni Saidpur; Sonbarsa; Suppi; Sursand	3,423,574	2,199	1,557	
35	SU	Supaul	Supaul	Basantpur; Chhatapur; Kishanpur; Marauna; Nirmali; Pipra; Pratapganj; Raghopur; Saraigarh-Bhaptiyahi; Supaul; Triveniganj	2,229,076	2,410	925	
36	SW	Siwan	Siwan	Andar; Barharia; Basantpur; Bhagwanpur Hat; Darauli; Daraundha; Goriakothi; Guthani; Hasanpura; Hussainganj; Lakri Nabiganj; Maharajganj; Mairwa; Nautan; Panchrukhi; Raghunathpur; Siswan; Siwan; Ziradei	3,330,464	2,219	1,501	
37	VA	Vaishali	Hajipur	Bhagwanpur; Bidupur; Chehra Kalan; Desari; Goraul; Hajipur; Jandaha; Lalganj; Mahnar; Mahua; Patedhi Belsar; Patepur; Raghopur; Rajapakar; Sahdei Buzurg; Vaishali	3,495,021	2,036	1,717	
38	WC	West Champaran	Bettiah	Bagaha; Bairia; Bettiah; Bhitaha; Chanpatia; Gaunaha; Jogapatti; Lauriya Nandangarh; Madhubani; Mainatand; Majhaulia; Narkatiaganj; Nautan; Piprasi; Ramnagar; Sidhaw; Sikta; Thakrahan	3,935,042	5,229	753	

== Proposed districts ==
There are several long-standing demands for the creation of new administrative districts in Bihar. These proposals are primarily driven by the high population density of existing divisions, significant geographical distances to current district headquarters, and the need for localized public service delivery.

List of Proposed Districts in Bihar Grouped by Current District
Proposed District	Expected Area of Jurisdiction	Rationale for Creation
Proposed from Patna
Barh	Barh sub-division and surrounding northeastern blocks of Patna district.	Proposed due to the geographical distance from Patna city and high localized population density, aiming to decentralize urban-rural governance.
Proposed from West Champaran
Valmiki Nagar (Bagaha)	Bagaha sub-division and adjacent northwestern forest tracts of West Champaran district.	Demanded to address the large geographical expansiveness of the current district, improve administration along the India-Nepal border, and streamline management near the Valmiki Tiger Reserve.

== See also ==
- Government of Bihar
  - Administration in Bihar
  - Interactive Map of Bihar's District
  - Cities in Bihar
  - Subdivisions of Bihar
  - Blocks in Bihar
  - Villages in Bihar
- Divisions of India
