= Kurmauta =

- Village
- Location in Bihar, India
- Coordinates: 26.3280429°N 84.2160228°E
- Country: India
- State: Bihar
- District: Siwan
- Subdivision: Siwan
- CD Block: Nautan
- Gram Panchayat: Nautan Gram Panchayat
- Headquarters: Nautan

Government
  - Type: Community development
  - Body: Nautan Block

Area
  - Total: 3.39 km^{2} (1.31 sq mi)

Population (2011)
  - Total: 2,714
  - Density: 801/km^{2} (2,070/sq mi)

Languages
  - Official: Bhojpuri, Hindi, Urdu, English
- Time zone: UTC+5:30 (IST)

Kurmauta is a village in Nautan Gram Panchayat of Nautan (community development block) of Siwan district in Indian state of Bihar. It is one out of several villages of Nautan block.

The total area of the village is 3.39 square kilometres (1.31 mi^{2}) and the total population of the village is 2,714 as of 2011 census of India. Nautan town is the headquarter of the village.

== See also ==
- Siwan Subdivision
- Administration in Bihar
