= Barharia =

Community development block in Siwan district, Bihar, India

- CD Block
- Location in Bihar, India
- Coordinates: 26.315481°N 84.456641°E
- Country: India
- State: Bihar
- District: Siwan
- Subdivision: Siwan
- Headquarters: Barhariya (town)

Government
  - Type: Bihar Government

Area
  - Total: 77.27 km^{2} (29.83 sq mi)
- Elevation: 68.8 m (226 ft)

Population (2011)
  - Total: 321,292
  - Density: 4,158/km^{2} (10,770/sq mi)

Languages
  - Official: Hindi, Urdu, English
- Time zone: UTC+5:30 (IST)
- PIN: 841232
- Telephone code: 06154
- Sex ratio: 912 per 1000 ♂/♀

Barharia is a community development block and a town in the northern part of the Siwan District in the Indian state of Bihar. It is one of 13 blocks located in Siwan Subdivision. Barharia is surrounded by Manjha Block to the north, Siwan Block to the south, Goriakothi Block to the east, and Thawe Block to the north. Mirganj, Siwan, Barauli, and Gopalganj are nearby cities.

The total population of Barharia is 321,292 as of the 2011 census and the total area of the block is 177.27 square kilometres (68.44 mi^{2}). Barharia town is the headquarters of this block.

It was in the national news in 2001 when part of the block was flooded by the Daha River.

== Demographics of Barharia ==
According to the 2011 Census of India the total population of Barharia block is 321,292. Out of these, 164,179 were males and 157,113 were females. 68.93% people were literate. 67.14% people were Hindu and 32.57% people were Muslim in the block.

== Gram panchayats ==
Barharia block is divided into 30 gram panchayats.

1. Lakri
2. Pakri
3. Aurae
4. Lakridargah
5. Kailgarh Uttar
6. Kailgarh Dakhin
7. Sunderpur
8. Hathigai
9. Kunwa
10. Rasulpur

11. Padrauna Khurd
12. Koirigawan
13. Balapur
14. Madhopur
15. Barharia (town)
16. Sadarpur
17. Tetahli
18. Nawalpur
19. Bahuara Kadir
20. Bahadurpur

21. Hardobara
22. Bhamopali
23. Rachhopali
24. Rampur
25. Bhopatpur
26. Sikandarpur
27. Bhaluara
28. Hariharpur lalgarh
29. Chaukhi Hasan
30. Dindayalpur

== Notable people ==
- Amir Subhani (born 1964), retired Indian Administrative Service (IAS) officer

== See also ==
- List of districts of Bihar
- Barharia (Vidhan Sabha constituency)
- Siwan district
- Siwan, Bihar
