= Bakulari =

- Village
- Location in Bihar, India
- Coordinates: 26.1313°N 84.0152°E
- Country: India
- State: Bihar
- District: Siwan
- Block/Police Station: Guthani
- Gram Panchayat: Sohagara

Government
  - Chief Minister: Nitish Kumar (JD(U))
  - MP: Smt. Vijaylakshmi Devi (JD(U))
  - MLA: Satyadeo Ram (CPI(M/L)(L))
  - Mukhiya: Vacant
  - Sarpanch: Basuri Pal

Area
  - Total: 1.13 km^{2} (0.44 sq mi)

Population (2011)
  - Total: 1,008
  - Density: 892/km^{2} (2,310/sq mi)

Languages
  - Local: Bhojpuri; Hindi
- Time zone: UTC+5:30 (IST)
- PIN: 841239
- Lok Sabha constituency: Siwan
- Vidhan Sabha constituency: Darauli
- Website: siwan.bih.nic.in

Bakulari is a village located in Sohagara Panchayat of Guthani Block of Siwan district in the Indian state of Bihar.

== Geography ==
Bakulari is a medium-sized village situated in the westernmost part of the Siwan district with a distance of about 35 km and about 185 km away from its state capital, Patna. It is in the northwest direction of Guthani Block (Police Station) with a distance of about 7 km. The distance between the state border of Uttar Pradesh and Bihar is 4 km from the west of it and less than 1 km from the south of it. A famous temple of Lord Shiva (Baba Hansnath) in Sohagara is just about 4 km from this village. On the southern end of the village, there is a very large pond like a lake namely "Bhagra Taal", which is very famous for Lotus (the national flower of India) and fishing at large scale, and also this pond is marked as the 'U.P. - Bihar Border' as it divides the two states here. On the banks of this pond, "Chhath Puja Ghat" is there. The total geographical area of this village is 113 hectares. The internal roads of the village are constructed with fully Plain Cement Concrete (PCC). The nearest major road at a distance of less than 1 km is Sohagara-Nainijor-Guthani Road. The nearest river to this village on the western side at a distance of about 2 km is Chhoti Gandak which is a tributary of Ghaghara River and both rivers meet near Guthani. Geographically, this village is situated at coordinates of 26°13′13.6" North and 84°01'52.4" East.

== Demographics ==
As of 2011 census of India, the number of families (houses) residing in this village is 164. The Bakulari village has a population of 1008, of which 480 are males while 528 are females, as per Population Census 2011. This village has 137 children (Boys-65, Girls-72) in the age group of 0–6 years which makes up 13.59% of the total population of the village. The average Sex Ratio of Bakulari village is 1100, which is higher than the Bihar state average of 918. The child sex ratio for the Bakulari as per census is 1108, higher than Bihar's average of 935. It is one of the 102 villages of Guthani Block of Siwan district.

== Education ==
Bakulari village is good in terms of education. As of 2011 census of India, Bakulari village has a higher literacy rate compared to Bihar. In 2011, the literacy rate of this village was 71.87% compared to 61.80% in Bihar. The male literacy stood at 81.20% while the female literacy rate was 63.38%. This village has a very old and famous school of Guthani Block namely "राजकीय मध्य विद्यालय - बकुलारी (Govt. Middle School - Bakulari)", which was founded in 1951, but this school is now upgraded from Middle School (up to 8th standard) to Secondary School Certificate (up to 10th standard). This school provides secondary education to the students, not only of Bakulari but also of its various neighbouring villages. In addition to this, many people of this village are well-educated in arts, engineering, literature, and science. There is also a Post Office with PIN Code 841239.

== Employment, culture, society and its people ==
The local languages are Bhojpuri and Hindi as well. There are people of various castes like Brahmins, Baitha (Dhobi), Gond, Rajbhar, Ram (Harijan), Rawat (Bari) etc. along with only 'one family' of Muslim religion in this village. Despite the diversity, there is 'fraternity and brotherhood' among the residents. There are some temples of Hindu deities like Goddesses Maa Kali and Chanki, Lord Hanuman and Lord Shiva. The number of employed people of Bakulari village is more than 150 working in Govt. sectors like Indian Railways, Teaching, Defence etc., private sectors including their businesses and also in Indian and Foreign companies as well. The major section of this village is also dependent on agriculture for its livelihood. The agriculture includes farming like the cultivation of paddy, wheat, millets, maize etc. and domestication of animals. The major sports played by the youth of this village are cricket and football. The name of the cricket team of this village is "Sadhu Baba Cricket Club, Bakulari".

== Nearest railway stations and towns ==
Railway Stations (Town)	Approx. Distance (in KM.)	Location
Siwan Jn.	44	Siwan, Bihar
Mairwa	21 (via Guthani), 17 (via Kurmauli-Sematar)	Siwan, Bihar
Bankata	11	Deoria, U.P.
Bhatpar Rani	15	Deoria, U.P.
Salempur Jn.	20 (via Majhauli), 18 (via Sahjaur)	Deoria, U.P.
Lar Road	22	Deoria, U.P.
Lar (Town)	12	Deoria, U.P.
Guthani (Town)	8	Siwan, Bihar

== Neighbouring villages ==
There are a lot of nearby villages like Sohagara, Katghara (U.P.), Bishunpura, Kurmauli, Daraila, Sematar, Khilwa, Tarawa Khurd, Puraina, Kharwaniya (U.P.) etc.
