= Mahrajganj =

Mahrajganj may refer to:

== Towns/District ==
=== Uttar Pradesh ===
- Maharajganj district, a district in Uttar Pradesh, India
- Mahrajganj, Azamgarh, a town in Azamgarh district in Uttar Pradesh, India
- Mahrajganj, Raebareli, a town in Rae Bareli district in Uttar Pradesh, India
- Mahrajganj, Uttar Pradesh, a town in Maharajganj district in Uttar Pradesh, India

=== Bihar ===
- Maharajganj, Siwan, a town in Bihar, India
- Maharajganj Subdivision, a subdivision of Bihar, India
- Maharajganj (community development block), a community block of Bihar, India

=== Nepal ===
- Maharajganj, Nepal, a village development committee in Kapilvastu District in the Lumbini Zone of southern Nepal

== Electoral constituencies ==
- Maharajganj Assembly constituency (disambiguation)
- Maharajganj (Bihar Lok Sabha constituency), India
- Maharajganj (Uttar Pradesh Lok Sabha constituency), India
- Maharajganj, Siwan (Vidhan Sabha constituency), Bihar, India

== See also ==
- Maharajganj (disambiguation)
