= Maharajganj =

Maharajganj may refer to:

== Bihar, India ==
- Maharajganj, Siwan
- Maharajganj Subdivision
- Maharajganj (community development block)
  - Maharajganj, Bihar Assembly constituency
  - Maharajganj, Bihar Lok Sabha constituency

== Uttar Pradesh, India ==
- Mahrajganj, Azamgarh
- Maharajganj district
  - Mahrajganj, Uttar Pradesh
- Maharajganj (Uttar Pradesh Lok Sabha constituency)

== Nepal ==
- Maharajganj, Nepal

== See also ==
- Mahrajganj (disambiguation)
- Maharaja (disambiguation)
- Ganj (disambiguation)
