= Lohaganjar =

Lohaganjar is a village located in Siwan, Bihar, India. It is 17 km far away from Siwan junction. Ziradei, Karchhui and Mairwa are the nearest railway stations. The distance between Ziradei station and Lohaganjar is five km.

Parliamentary constituency	Siwan
constituency	Darauli
population	1k approx
institutions	R.S high school, Govt Middle school
Block	ziradei
