= Sani Basantpur, Siwan =

Sani Basantpur
- Village Council
- Location of Goriakothi Block
- Coordinates: 26.253333°N 84.6075°E
- Country: India
- State: Bihar

Government
  - Lok Sabha constituency: Maharajganj
  - Assembly seat: Goriakothi

Area
  - Total: 1.06 km^{2} (0.41 sq mi)
- Elevation: 66 m (217 ft)

Population
  - Total: 4,506
  - Density: 4,250/km^{2} (11,000/sq mi)

Demographics
  - Literacy: 73%
  - Sex ratio: 938 (Males: 2,325- 51.6%, Females: 2,181- 48.4%)
- Time zone: UTC+5:30 (IST)
- PIN: 841439
- Area code: 06154
- Major highways: SH-73

Sani Basantpur is a village council situated in Goriakothi Block in Siwan district of Bihar state, India. It belongs to Saran division. It is located 21 km towards east from district headquarters Siwan and 117 km from the state capital Patna. Sani Basantpur's PIN code is 841439. Mustfabad is sub post office of Sani Basantpur. Nearby cities to Sani Basantpur is Siwan, Maharajganj, Barauli, Gopalganj

== History ==
Sani Basantpur is situated in the western part of the State, was originally a sub-division of Saran district. Mukhiya Asghar Miyan 10yrs

== Geography ==
Situated on bank of Gandak River, one of the major rivers of Nepal and a left bank tributary of the Ganges in India.

== Demographics ==
According to the 2011 census Basantpur has a population of 4054.

== Nearby villages ==
- Heyatpur
- Jagdishpur
- Sangrampur
- Satwar

== Notable people ==
- Ashgar miyan (mukhiya jii) born on 1/1/1965. He is mukhiya of sanibasantpur panchayat since 2015. By his dedication and care for public of sanibasantpur he successfully completed 10 years as a mukhiya of sanibasantpur.
- Shamim Mansuri Navy officer (Urdu: معراج عالم انصاری, born 12 January 1998) professionally known by his pen name Famyas Siwani (Urdu: فام یاس سیوانی, Hindi: फामयास सीवानी) is an Indian Urdu poet, writer and non-fiction Novelist from Sani Basantpur, Siwan, Bihar. He wrote his poetry in hindi and urdu languages and it's famous for verse, couplet and gazals under the Takhallus Famyas. (Note: Takhallus is a pseudonym, fictitious or a pen name used by the Urdu or Persian speaking people when they perform a particular social or cultural role such as poetry etc.)
- Arsad Mansuri was born 26 august 2008 and he is famous youtuber and entrepreneur. He is a founder of growth guild and lavior style and he is also building a his family business, Mansuri Construction
