= Bhatni =

Bhatni may refer to:

- Bhatni, Bhopal, a village in Madhya Pradesh, India
- Bhatni Bazar, a village in Uttar Pradesh, India
