= Sujawn =

Village in Bihar, Eastern India

Sujanw is a village in Siwan district, Bihar, India, near the village of Pachlakhi. The village was divided into two parts after a fire. The original village is called Sujawn and the divided part is known as Musehari. The village is dependent on Pachlakhi.

== Village structure ==
About 40% of the villagers belong to the Koiri caste, and some are Kamkar, Bhumihar, and scheduled castes and scheduled tribes. Hindus make up 80% of the population, and Muslims 20%.

== Sujawn Statistics ==
Sujaon is one of the villages in Siwan district. Sujaon is present in block Siwan. The total population of the village is 2,545. The literacy rate is 38%. The female literacy rate is 20.6%. The male literacy rate is 55.06%.

Sujaon Village Important Note:

The number of households in Sujaon is 397. All the households are rural households. Female to male ratio of Sujaon is 99.76% compared to Bihar's female to male ratio of 91.93%. It is unsatisfactory and the people should drive some campaign to improve this.

The literacy rate of the village is 38% compared to the state literacy rate of 47%. The literacy rate of the village is less than the state literacy rate. The rate of literacy is very low and needs immediate attention of Union and State Government.

The female literacy rate is 20.6% compared to the male literacy rate of 55.49%.

The total working population is 36.84% of the total population. 56.07% of the men are working population. 17.7% of the women are working population.

The main working population is 23.75% of the total population. 40.91% of the men are main working population. 6.67% of the women are main working population, while the marginal working population is 13.09% of the total population. 15.16% of the men are marginal working population. 11.03% of the women are marginal working population.

The total non-working population is 63.16% of the total population. 43.93% of the men are non-working population. 82.3% of the women are non-working population.

== Education in Sujawn ==
There is one primary school in Sujawn, and the middle school and high school are in Pachlakhi. The literacy rate of Sujawn is very low. All the students depend on migration for their studies.

== Important persons of Sujawn ==
- Amlawati Devi (Ex mukhiya)
- Gorakh Sah (Ex B.D.C.)
- Avinash Kumar Pandey (press at electronic media)
- Jaglal Chawdhary
- Arun Kumar Singh (Ramdyal Master)
- Dr. Vinay Prasad (D.H.M.S.)
- Sanjay Singh (press at electronic media)
