= Patna division =

Administrative division in Bihar, India

Patna Division
- Division of Bihar
- Location of Patna division in Bihar
- Coordinates: 25.611°N 85.144°E
- Country: India
- State: Bihar
- Established: 1829
- Headquarters: Patna
- Districts: Bhojpur, Buxar, Kaimur, Nalanda, Patna, Rohtas

Government
  - Divisional Commissioner: Sanjay Kumar Agrawal IAS

Area
  - Total: 16,960 km^{2} (6,550 sq mi)

Population (2011) (Note: Population data obtained from the sum of the populations of the districts.)
  - Total: 17,662,618
- Website: patnadivision.bih.nic.in

Patna Division is one of the nine administrative units of Bihar, a state in the east of India. Patna is the headquarters of the division. Established in 1829, it is one of the oldest divisions of the state.

== History of administrative districts in Patna Division ==
Patna Division was established in 1829 as the 11th division of the Bengal Presidency in British India, along with Saran Division and Bhagalpur Division. At the time of its formation, Saran Division comprised the districts of Saran, Champaran, Tirhut, and Shahabad, while Bhagalpur Division included Monghyr, Bhagalpur, Purnea, and Maldah districts. On 1 March 1834, Saran Division was abolished and merged into Patna Division. Following the merger, Patna Division included the districts of Patna, Gaya, Saran, Champaran, and Shahabad. Around the same period, the former Tirhut district was abolished and replaced by the newly created districts of Muzaffarpur and Darbhanga. In 1908, the administrative boundaries of Patna Division were reorganized. A separate Tirhut Division was created from the northern districts of Saran, Champaran, Muzaffarpur, and Darbhanga, while Patna Division was reconstituted with the districts of Patna, Gaya, and Shahabad. After Indian independence, the Government of Bihar created the separate Magadh Division from the Gaya region of Patna Division.

== Districts, subdivisions, and blocks ==
Patna Division (Headquarters: Patna) 6 districts, 19 subdivisions, and 93 blocks
#	District	Headquarters	Subdivisions	Subdivision names
1	Kaimur	Bhabua	2	Bhabua
1	Kaimur	Bhabua	2	Mohania
2	Bhojpur	Arrah	3	Ara
2	Bhojpur	Arrah	3	Jagdishpur
2	Bhojpur	Arrah	3	Piro
3	Buxar	Buxar	2	Buxar
3	Buxar	Buxar	2	Dumraon
4	Nalanda	Bihar Sharif	3	Bihar Sharif
4	Nalanda	Bihar Sharif	3	Rajgir
4	Nalanda	Bihar Sharif	3	Hilsa
5	Patna	Patna	6	Patna Sadar
5	Patna	Patna	6	Patna City
5	Patna	Patna	6	Barh
5	Patna	Patna	6	Danapur
5	Patna	Patna	6	Masaurhi
5	Patna	Patna	6	Paliganj
6	Rohtas	Sasaram	3	Sasaram
6	Rohtas	Sasaram	3	Bikramganj
6	Rohtas	Sasaram	3	Dehri

== See also ==
- Divisions of Bihar
- Districts of Bihar
