= Local government in Bihar =

Governance in the state of Bihar

Administration in Bihar
- Seal of Bihar
- Seat of Government: Patna

Legislative branch
- Assembly: Bihar Legislative Assembly
- Speaker: Prem Kumar
- Members in Assembly: 243
- Council: Bihar Legislative Council
- Chairman: Awadhesh Narain Singh
- Members in Council: 75

Executive branch
- Governor: Syed Ata Hasnain
- Chief Minister: Samrat Choudhary

Judiciary
- High Court: Patna High Court
- Chief Justice: Justice Sudhir Singh (Acting)

Bihar is a state situated in Eastern India. It is neighbored by West Bengal to the east, Uttar Pradesh to the west, Jharkhand to the south and Nepal to the north.

== History ==
Recent History of
Administrative of structure
Bihar

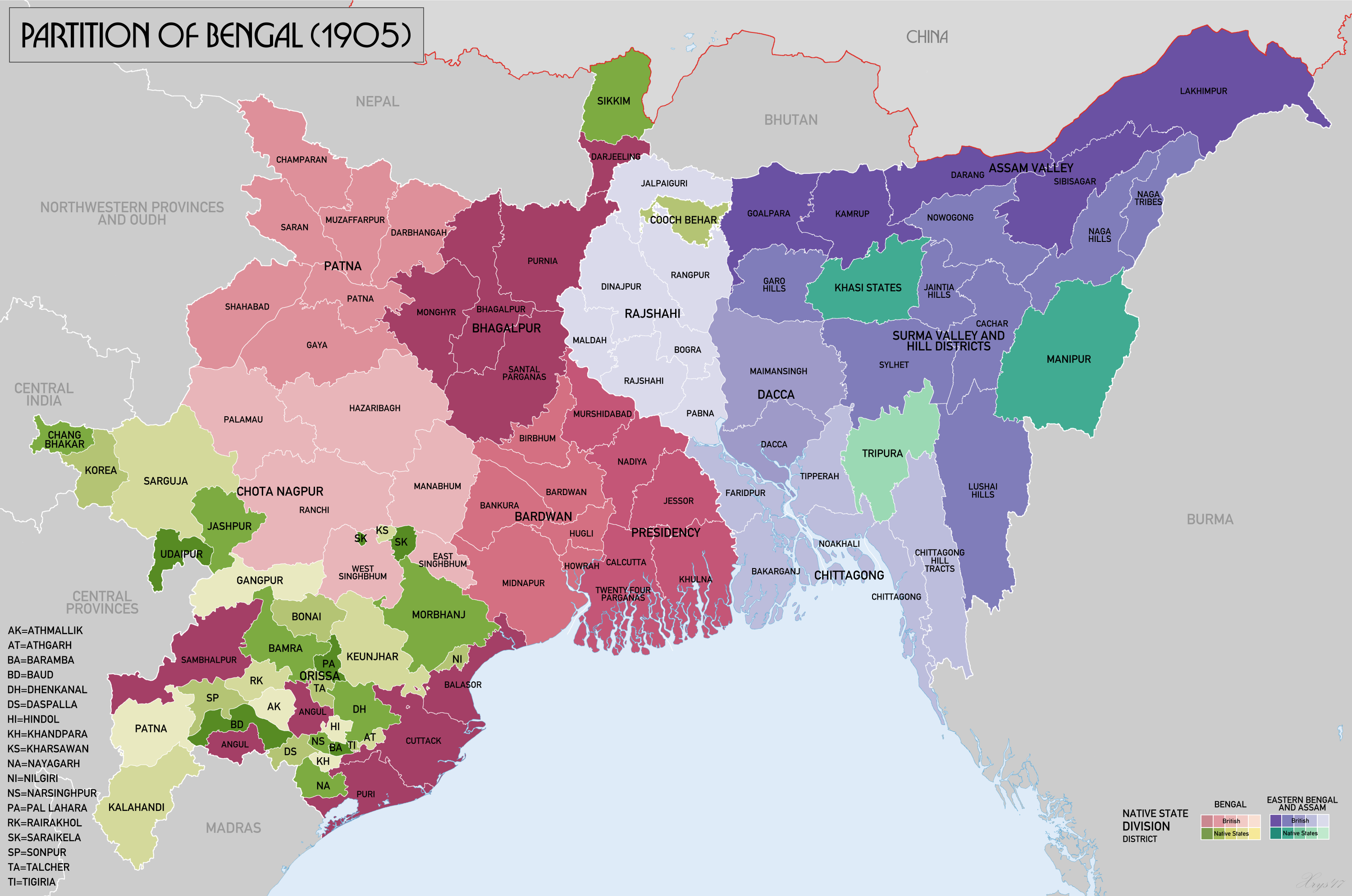
Bihar as part of
Bengal Presidency
(1776–1912)^{[Note 1]}

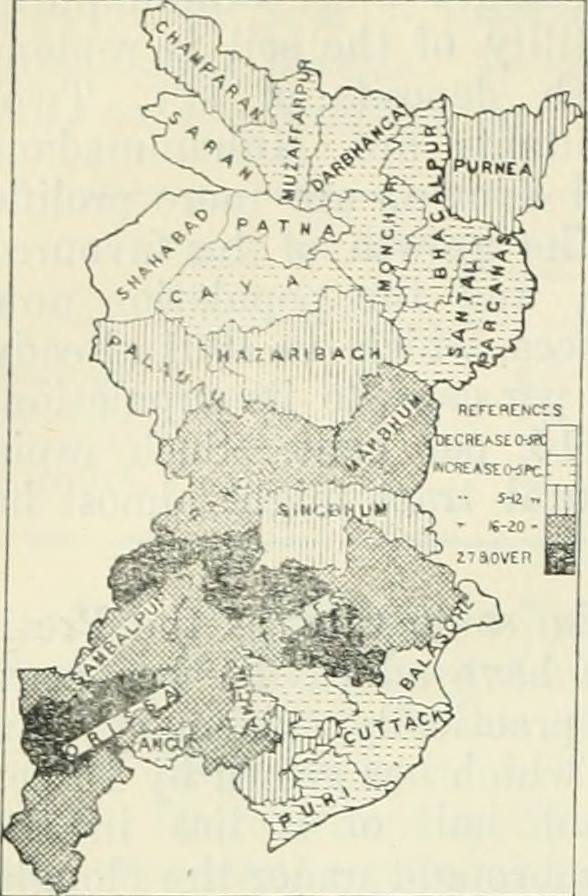
Bihar and Orissa Province
(1912–1936)

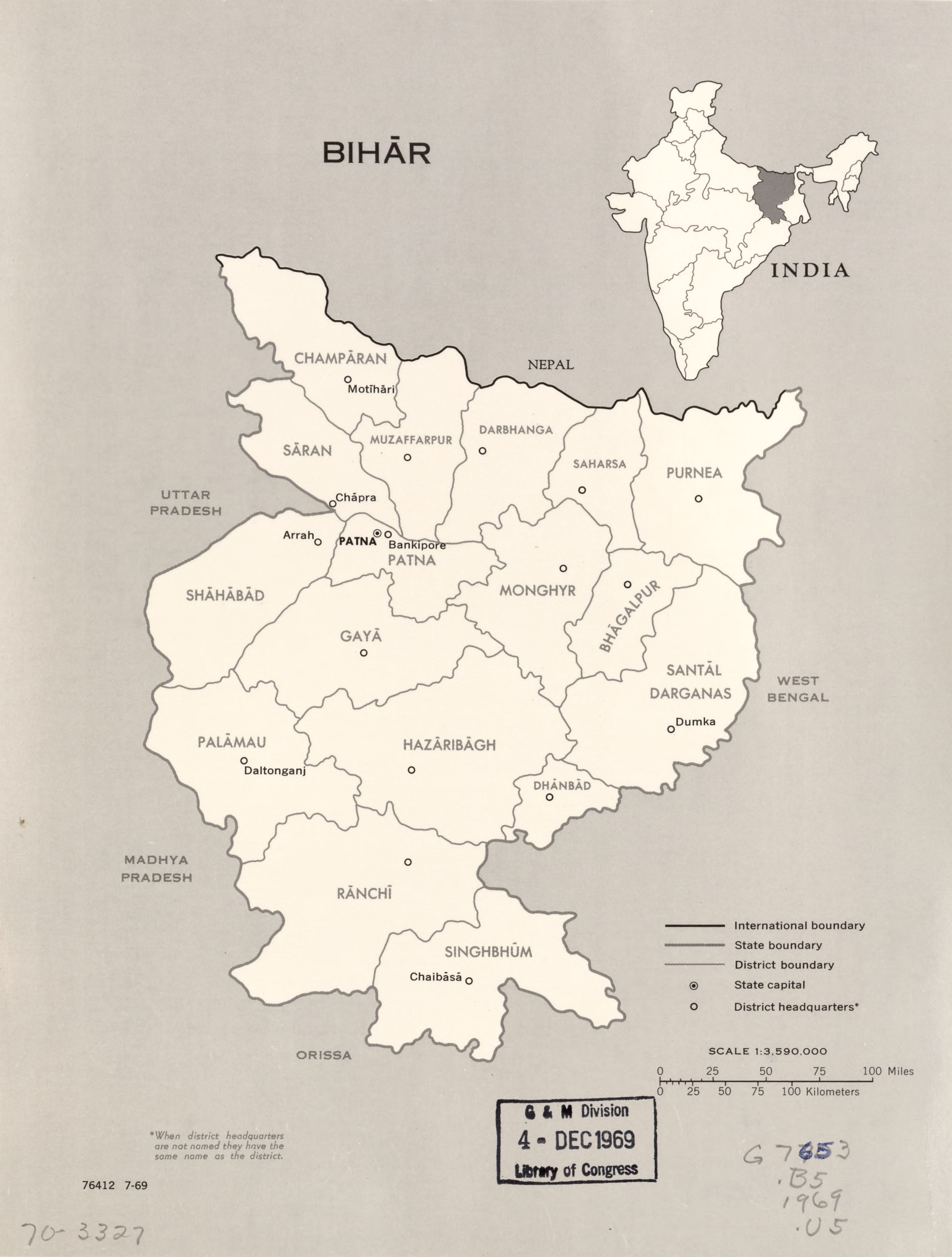
Bihar Province
(Pre-independence )
Bihar State
(Post-independence )
1936–2000

Bihar after
Bihar Jharkhand bifurcation
post 2011

[Note 1] : 1905 map of Bengal Presidency, British India

Magadha, Anga and Vajjika League of Mithila, c. 600 BCE.

=== Bengal Presidency ===
Before 1905, Bihar was a part of British East India Company's Bengal Presidency. In 1905 the Bengal Presidency was divided and created two new provinces: East Bengal and West Bengal. Until then Bihar was part of West Bengal. Again West Bengal and East Bengal reunited in 1911 but the people of Bihar and Orrisa demanded a separate province based on language rather than religion. In 1912 Bihar and Orissa Province was created separating from Bengal Presidency. In 1936, Bihar and Orrisa Province divided into two new provinces: Bihar Province and Orissa Province.

=== Bihar and Orissa Province ===
Following Divisions were included in Bihar and Orissa Province when it separated from Bengal Presidency in 1912:

- Bhagalpur Division (districts of Bhagalpur, Munger (Monghyr), Purnea and the Santhal Parganas)
- Patna Division (Gaya, Patna and Shahabad)
- Tirhut Division (Champaran, Darbhanga, Muaffarpur and Saran)
- Chota Nagpur Division (Hazaribagh, Manbhum, Palamau, Ranchi and Singhbhum)
- Orissa Division (Angul, Balasore, Cuttack, Puri and Sambatpur)

On 1 April 1936 Bihar and Orissa Province was divided into two new provinces: Bihar Province and Orissa Province

=== Bihar Province ===
In 1936, Bihar became a separate province including part of Jharkhand.

After the independence of India in 1951, Bihar including Jharkhand had 18 divisions, and had 55 districts in 1991.

=== Bihar ===
In 2000, Bihar again divided into two states: the current Bihar and Jharkhand. In 2001 Bihar had a total of 38 districts.

== Administrative structure ==
=== Structure ===
Administrative divisions
Divisions	9
Districts	38
Subdivisions	101
Cities and towns	261
Blocks	534
Villages	45,103
Panchayats	8,058
Police Districts	43
Police Stations	1064

Structurally Bihar is divided into divisions (Pramandal), districts (Zila), sub-divisions (Anumandal) & circles (Aanchal).The state is divided into nine divisions, 38 districts, 101 subdivisions and 534 circles. 17 municipal corporations, 84 Nagar Parishads and 151 Nagar Panchayats, for administrative purposes.

India
Bihar
Divisions
Districts
Blocks (Tehsils)	Municipal Corporations (Nagar Nigam)	Municipal Councils (Nagar Parishad)	Town Council (Nagar Panchayat)
Villages (Graam/Gau'n)	Wards

=== Divisions and Districts ===
There are 38 districts in Bihar, grouped into 9 divisions —Patna, Tirhut, Saran, Darbhanga, Kosi, Purnia, Bhagalpur, Munger and Magadh —are as listed below.

Division	Headquarters	Districts	District map of Bihar
Patna	Patna	Bhojpur, Buxar, Kaimur, Patna, Rohtas, Nalanda	
Magadh	Gaya	Arwal, Aurangabad, Gaya, Jehanabad, Nawada	
Saran	Chapra	Saran, Siwan , Gopalganj	
Tirhut	Muzaffarpur	East Champaran, Muzaffarpur, Sheohar, Sitamarhi, Vaishali, West Champaran	
Purnia	Purnia	Araria, Katihar, Kishanganj, Purnia	
Bhagalpur	Bhagalpur	Banka, Bhagalpur	
Darbhanga	Darbhanga	Darbhanga, Madhubani, Samastipura	
Kosi	Saharsa	Madhepura, Saharsa, Supaul	
Munger	Munger	Begusarai,Jamui, Khagaria, Munger, Lakhisarai, Sheikhpura	

=== Sub-divisions ===
Sub-divisions (Anumandal) in Bihar are like sub-districts. There are 101 subdivisions in Bihar.

=== Blocks ===
The Indian state of Bihar is divided into 534 CD Block called blocks.

==== List of Blocks in Bihar ====
District	Block
Gaya	Gurua
Gaya	Konch
Gaya	Manpur
Gaya	Paraiya
Gaya	BankeBazar
Gaya	Imamganj
Gaya	Dumariya
Gaya	Barachatti
Gaya	wazirganj
Gaya	Sherghati
Gaya	Tekari

District	Block
Nawada	Akbarpur
Nawada	Govindpur
Nawada	Hisua
Nawada	Kashichak
Nawada	Kawakol
Nawada	Meskaur
Nawada	Nardiganj
Nawada	Narhat
Nawada	Nawada
Nawada	Pakribarawan
Nawada	Rajauli
Nawada	Roh
Nawada	Sirdala
Nawada	Warisaliganj

District	Block
Bhagalpur	Bihpur
Bhagalpur	Gopalpur
Bhagalpur	Naugachhia
Bhagalpur	Ismailpur
Bhagalpur	Rangrachowk
Bhagalpur	Narayanpur
Bhagalpur	Sabour
Bhagalpur	Sanhaula
Bhagalpur	Goradih
Bhagalpur	Kharik

District	Block
Siwan	Andar
Siwan	Barharia
Siwan	Basantpur
Siwan	Bhagwanpur Hat
Siwan	Darauli
Siwan	Daraundha
Siwan	Goriakothi
Siwan	Guthani
Siwan	Hasanpura
Siwan	Hussainganj, Siwan
Siwan	Lakri Nabiganj
Siwan	Maharajganj
Siwan	Mairwa
Siwan	Nautan
Siwan	Panchrukhi
Siwan	Raghunathpur, Siwan
Siwan	Siswan
Siwan	Siwan
Siwan	Ziradei

District	Block
Vaishali	Bhagwanpur
Vaishali	Bidupur
Vaishali	Chehrakala
Vaishali	Desari
Vaishali	Goraul
Vaishali	Hajipur
Vaishali	Jandaha
Vaishali	Lalganj
Vaishali	Mahnar
Vaishali	Mahua
Vaishali	Patedhi Belsar
Vaishali	Patepur
Vaishali	Raghopur, Vaishali
Vaishali	Rajapakar
Vaishali	Sahdei Buzurg
Vaishali	Vaishali

District	Block
Madhepura	Alamnagar
Madhepura	Bihariganj
Madhepura	Chousa
Madhepura	Gamhariya
Madhepura	Ghelardh
Madhepura	Gwalpara
Madhepura	Kumarkhand
Madhepura	Madhepura
Madhepura	Murliganj
Madhepura	Puraini
Madhepura	Shankarpur
Madhepura	Singheshwar
Madhepura	Udakishunganj

=== Urban Local Government ===
==== Municipal Bodies ====
As per Census 2011, Bihar is the second least urbanised state in the country, with a rate of urbanisation of 11.3%, as compared to the national rate of 31.16%. The state has 139 StatutoryTowns and 60 Census Towns.

For the administration of the urban areas, Bihar has 264 Urban Local Bodies (ULBs) consisting of 19 municipal corporations, 89 nagar parishads (city councils), and 156 nagar panchayats (town councils). Bihar has one municipal act to establish and govern all municipalities in the state: Bihar Municipal Act, 2007.

As per a 2017 report by the Comptroller and Auditor General of India, Urban Local Bodies (ULBs) in Bihar carry out 12 out of 18 functions, and the remaining 6 are carried out by Bihar state government departments. The Fifth Bihar State Finance Commission report states that the ULB funds are ‘grossly inadequate for their assigned functions, they are unable to utilize even that’.

The Bihar Municipal Act, 2007 creates the following categories of urban areas based on their population. All three types of urban areas must have at least 75% of their population engaged in non-agricultural work.

Types of Urban Areas according to the Bihar Municipal Act, 2007
Type	Population Criteria	Type of Local Body
City	Larger urban area: 2 lakh or more	Municipal Corporation
Town	Medium urban area: 40 thousand or more but less than 2 lakh	Municipal Council
Small Town or Transitional Area	12 thousand and more but less than 40 thousand	Nagar Panchayat

Further, depending on the population size, the Act prescribes the minimum and maximum number of councillors/wards allowed within each type of local government.

Minimum and Maximum number of Councillors/Wards Allowed according to the Bihar Municipal Act, 2007
Population Range	Minimum	Incremental Number	Maximum
Municipal Corporations
Above 10 lakh	67	One additional Councillor for every 75,000 above 10 lakh	75
Above 5 lakh up to 10 lakh	57	One additional Councillor for every 50,000 above 5 lakh	67
Above 2 lakh up to 5 lakh	45	One additional Councillor for every 25,000 above 2 lakh	57
Municipal Council
Class 'A' Municipal Council	42	One additional Councillor for every 15,000 above 1,50,000	45
Class 'B' Municipal Council	37	One additional Councillor for every 10,000 above 1 lakh	42
Class 'C' Municipal Council	25	One additional Councillor for every 5,000 above 40, 000	37
Nagar Panchayat
Nagar Panchayat	10	One additional Member for every 2,000 above 12,000	25

The Act mentions the following key positions as well as committees for ULBs:

Elected Officials	Administrative Officials	Committees
Councillor, Chief Councillor, Deputy Chief Councillor	Municipal Commissioner, Controller of Municipal Finances and Accounts, Municipal Internal Auditor, Chief Municipal Engineer, Municipal Architect and Town Planner, Chief Municipal Health Officer, Municipal Law Officer, Municipal Secretary, three Additional Municipal commissioners Such number of Joint Municipal Commissioners or Deputy Municipal Commissioners or Deputy Chief Municipal Engineers as the Empowered Standing Committee may, from time to time, determine,	Empowered Standing Committee, Joint Committee, Municipal Accounts Committee, Subject Committee, Ward Committee, Wards Committee

==== Ward Committees ====
Bihar Municipal Act, 2007 mandates the establishment of Ward Committees through the Bihar Urban Local Body (Community Participation) Rules, 2013. Section 31 of the Bihar Municipal Act, 2007 mandates the establishment of Ward Committees for each ward of a municipality. The ward level elected councillor would be the chairperson of their respective Ward Committee. Up to 10 representatives from the civil society belonging to the ward would be nominated into the committee by the ULB.

Even though the creation of ward committees is mandated in municipalities, they have not been formed in Bihar.

== Government ==
Like other states in India, the head of state of Bihar is the Governor, appointed by the President of India on the advice of the central government. His or her post is largely ceremonial. The Chief Minister is the head of government and is vested with most of the executive powers. Patna is the capital of Bihar.

The Patna High Court, located in Patna, has jurisdiction over the whole state. The present legislative structure of Bihar is bicameral. The Legislative houses are the Bihar Vidhan Sabha (Bihar Legislative Assembly) and Bihar Vidhan Parishad (Bihar Legislative Council). Their normal term is five years, unless dissolved earlier.

=== Legislature ===
Bihar is one of the six states where bicameral legislature exists. Other states are Uttar Pradesh, Karnataka, Maharashtra, Telangana and Andhra Pradesh. The Vidhan Parishad serves as the upper house and Vidhan Sabha serves as the lower house of a bicameral legislature. The current strength of the Bihar Vidhan Parishad is 75 (63 Elected + 12 Nominated) is a permanent body. The current strength of the Bihar Vidhan Sabha is 243 and is not a permanent body which means it is subject to dissolution.

=== Judiciary ===
==== High court ====
The Patna High Court (Hindi: पटना उच्च न्यायालय) is the High Court of the state of Bihar and was established on 9 February 1916 and later affiliated under the Government of India Act 1915. The Patna High Court is the principle civil courts in Bihar. However, a high court exercises its original civil and criminal jurisdiction only if the subordinate courts are not authorized by law to try such matters for lack of pecuniary, territorial jurisdiction. High courts may also enjoy original jurisdiction in certain matters, if so designated especially in a state or federal law. The Patna High Court has 53 Judges which includes 40 permanent and 13 additional judges.

== See also ==
- Administration in India
- Government of Bihar
- Divisions of Bihar
- Districts in Bihar
