= Kendriya Vidyalaya Maharajganj =

High school in Maharajganj, Bihar

- Ujaen, Maharajganj, Siwan district, Bihar 841233, India

Information
- School type: Central Government
- Motto: Tattvaṃ Pūṣanapāvṛṇu ("The face of Truth is covered by a golden vessel, Remove Thou, O Sun, that covering, for the law of Truth to behold.")
- Established: 2012
- Sister school: All Kendriya Vidyalayas across India
- Authority: Ministry of Human Resource Development
- Chairman: Amit Kumar Pandey, IAS District Magistrate, Siwan
- Principal: Suresh Kumar, M.sc M.ed
- Headmaster: Mr. Abhimanyu Yadav, M.sc. M.ed
- Staff: 12(Permanent) 6(contractual)
- Enrollment: approx 200
- Classes: Grade 5th-10th
- Language: English and Hindi
- Schedule type: Morning
- Hours in school day: 5-6 hrs
- Campus type: co-educational
- Houses: Shivaji , Ashoka , Raman , Tagore
- Colour: maroon (school colour)
- Song: "Bhaarat ka svarnim gaurav kendreey vidyaalay laega" (India's golden glory will bring Kendriya Vidyalaya)
- Sports: Football, Cricket, Volleyball, Kabaddi and Kho kho
- Website: https://maharajganj.kvs.ac.in/

English: Daya Kar Daan (KV Maharajganj Morning Prayer)

Audio sample
- K V Maharajganj Morning Prayer- Daya Kar Daan: file; help

Kendriya Vidyalaya Maharajganj is a secondary school affiliated to the CBSE board in Maharajganj, Bihar. The current principal is Suresh Kumar. It was established in 2012. It is a part of the Kendriya Vidyalaya Sangathan.

== History ==
The Kendriya Vidyalaya Sangathan is the organization set up by the Ministry of Human Resource Development (MHRD) to oversee the Kendriya Vidyalaya schools. To cater to the educational needs of the children of Central government employees, K.V. Maharajganj started functioning with two hundred students in 2012. It is a co-educational institution, with classes from V to X, affiliated to the Central Board of Secondary Education (CBSE), New Delhi.

== Management ==
This school is managed by Kendriya Vidyalaya Sangathan, an autonomous organization of the Ministry of Human Resource Development. Main affairs of school are looked after by the KVS regional office in Patna. Deputy Commissioner is head of Region and District Magistrate of the concerned district is the Chairman of the Vidyalaya Management Committee with local educationists, public representatives and officials from the District as members. The school principal is Suresh Kumar.

=== School Session ===
The school year is from April to March. Days are divided into eight-periods with summer and winter timings. The order in which the classes meet varies from day to day.

== Student council ==
The Student Council is a body of student representatives, headed by the School Captain. It is made up of the captains of the teams and representatives from other co-curricular activities along with elected and nominated students of each class from grade VI through X. Parliamentary procedure is used at meetings and the main purpose of this group is to assist the Principal, staff, and students in fulfilling their responsibilities. The student members help maintain order in the school during the Assembly and breaks, in between classes, and also on days of important school events.

The Student Council is elected every year (in April) through the election in the supervision of Principal and teachers.

== Premises ==
The school operates from a temporary building located in the campus of Shri Gauri Shankar Vidyalaya, Ujain, Maharajganj, Siwan district, Bihar, India.

=== Infrastructure ===
There are 5 classrooms, 1 science lab, a fully automated library, a computer lab, a children's playground, a cricket pitch, a volleyball court, and an athletics field.

== Staff and curriculum ==
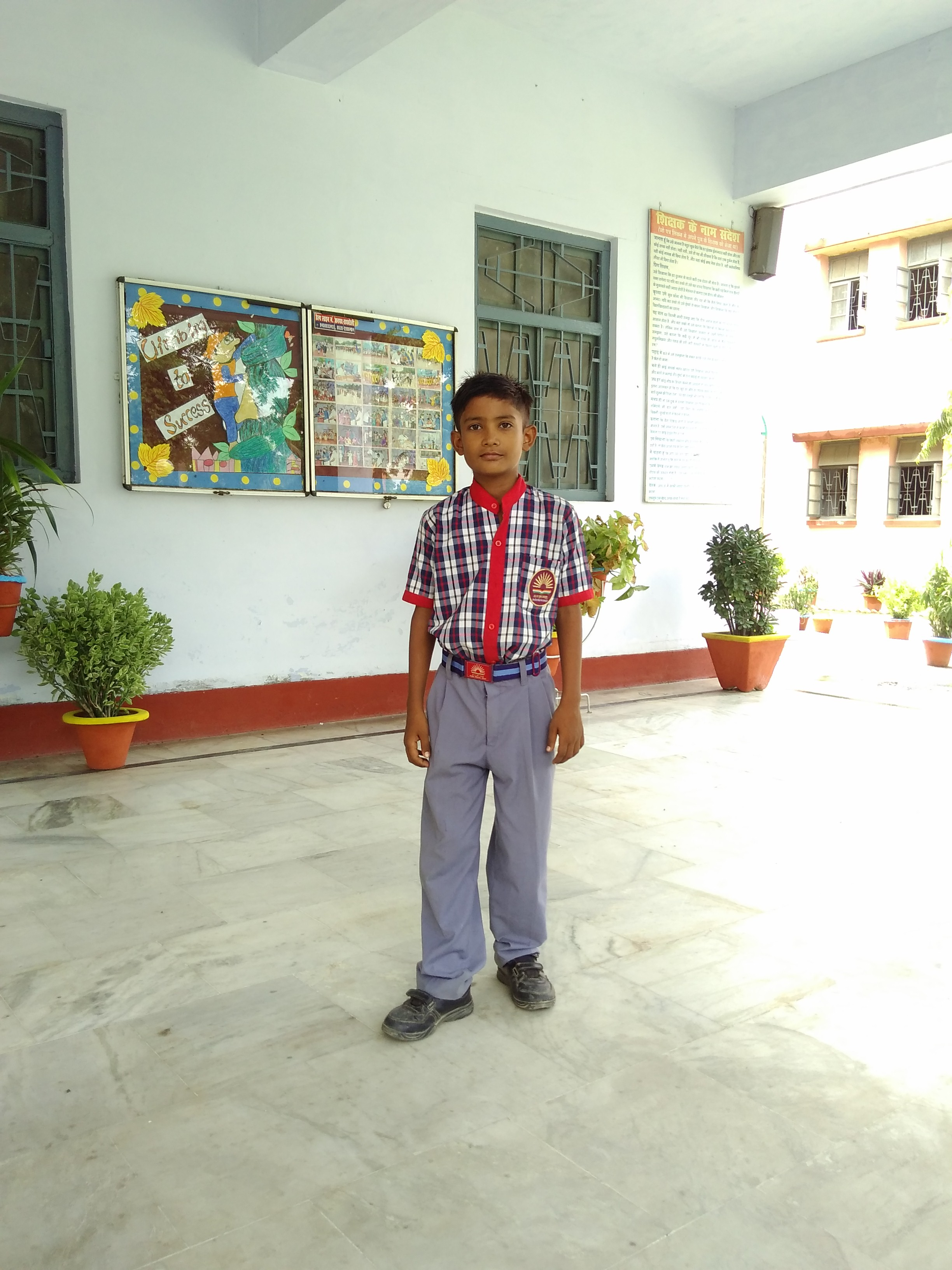
School Uniform of Kendriya Vidyalaya Maharajganj

The staff consists of 10 teachers, supervised by the Principal.

== Gallery ==
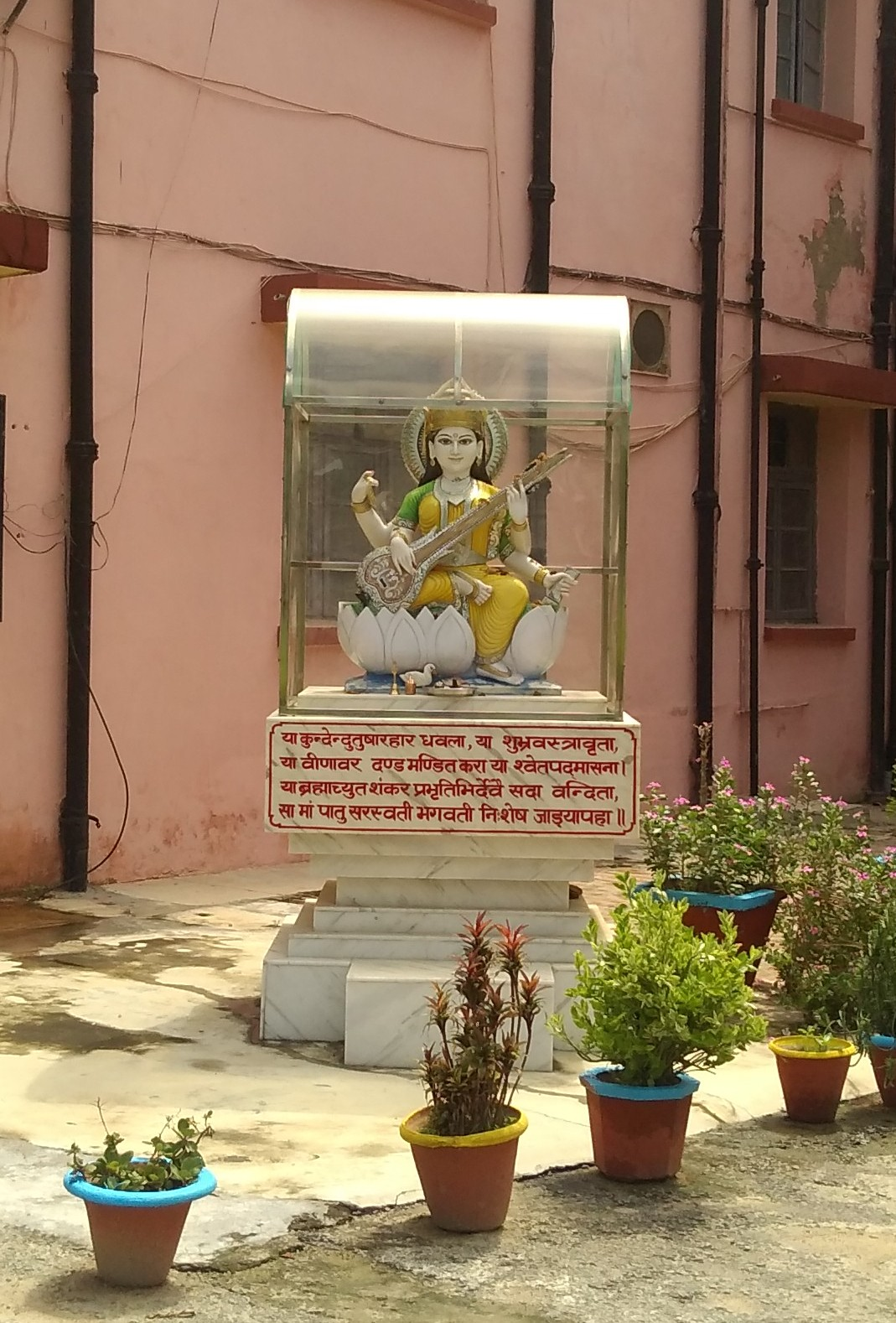
Statue of Goddess Saraswati at Kendriya Vidyalaya Maharajganj

== See also ==
- List of Kendriya Vidyalayas
