= Rajpur, Siwan =

Rajpur is a large village located in Raghunathpur Block in Siwan district in Bihar. It belongs to Saran Division. It is located 28 km towards South from District headquarters Siwan. 3 km from RaghunathPur. 114 km from State capital Patna. Rajpur Pin code is 841504 and postal head office is Raghunathpur (Siwan). As per the administration register, the village code of Rajpur is 232505. The village has 604 homes. This Place is in the border of the Siwan District and Ballia District. Ballia District Maniar is west towards this place. It is near to the Uttar Pradesh State Border.

Rajpur Local Language is Bhojpuri. Rajpur village population of children with age 0-6 is 593 which makes up 15.56% of total population of village. Average Sex Ratio of Rajpur village is 944 which is higher than Bihar state average of 918. Child Sex Ratio for the Rajpur as per census is 895, lower than Bihar average of 935.

== Nearby Villages of Rajpur ==
Santhi (3 km), Adampur(3 km) fulwariya (3 km), Narhan (4 km), Nikhti Kala (5 km), Patar (7 km), Panjwar (8 km), Raghunathpur(2 km) are the nearby Villages to Rajpur. Rajpur is surrounded by Andar Block towards North, Maniar Block (Uttar Pradesh) towards west, Bansdih Block (Uttar Pradesh) towards South, HasanPura Block towards East.

== Nearby Towns of Rajpur ==
Siwan, Maharajganj, Reoti, Deoria, Ballia are the nearby towns to Rajpur.

== Colleges in Rajpur ==
High School Rajpur, Rajpur More (Siwan)

== Notable people ==
Subedar Major Bipin Bihari Singh – A distinguished soldier from Rajpur, Siwan, who served in the Indian Army from 1960. He participated in the 1962 Sino-Indian War, 1965 Indo-Pak War, 1967 Nathu La–Cho La clashes, and played a key role in the 1971 Bangladesh Liberation War. He rose to the rank of Subedar Major and was appointed a Junior Commissioned Officer in 1982 by President Neelam Sanjiva Reddy.
