= Noori Mian =

Indian businessperson (died 1921)

Noori Mian Indian Business person

Personal details
- Born: Balua Guthani Siwan
- Died: 29 December 1921
- Profession: Sugar Mill Owner, Business

Noori Mian (or Noor Mohammad; died 1921) was a businessman from Siwan who laid the foundation of industry in the backward areas of eastern Uttar Pradesh, particularly Bhatni in Deoria district, and to some extent Siwan, Bihar, by establishing sugar mills in the early 1900s.

== Early life and career ==
Noori Mian was born at village Balua Guthani Siwan in Bihar (birth date: unknown). In early 1900s he established Bhatni sugar mill, working at the same time toward the expansion of the town by founding a housing area for sugar mill workers, and a business area (market), which together were known as Nooriganj Bazar, named after him. The aforementioned facilities exist even today, helping in the growth of Bhatni as a block in Deoria district. Noori Sugar work (or Bhatni sugar mill) lasted for long during which time people and the farmers benefited even though interventions by the state government was needed lately. His vision to develop the backward area was evident from the fact that his residential house was found in his native village Balua, Guthani block Siwan district and not in any big city. From the structure of the building it was clear that a significant wealth was spent. Later his family was involved in social work i.e. building a Musafir Khana for travelers near the railway station in Deoria including a school for girls.

== Death ==
Noori Mian died on 29 December 1921 and was buried in Nooriganj Kabrastan.
