= Sharif Jalalpur =

Indian village

Coordinates: 26.2462°N 84.6568°E

Sharif Jalalpur is a village in Siwan district of Bihar state, India.

This village is part of Bhopatpur panchayat and located in west of bhopatpur. This village is bounded by west in sikatiya village east in Bharathiya village north in Dumra and south in khawaspur.
