= Siwan Junction railway station =

Railway station in Siwan, Bihar, India

Siwan Junction
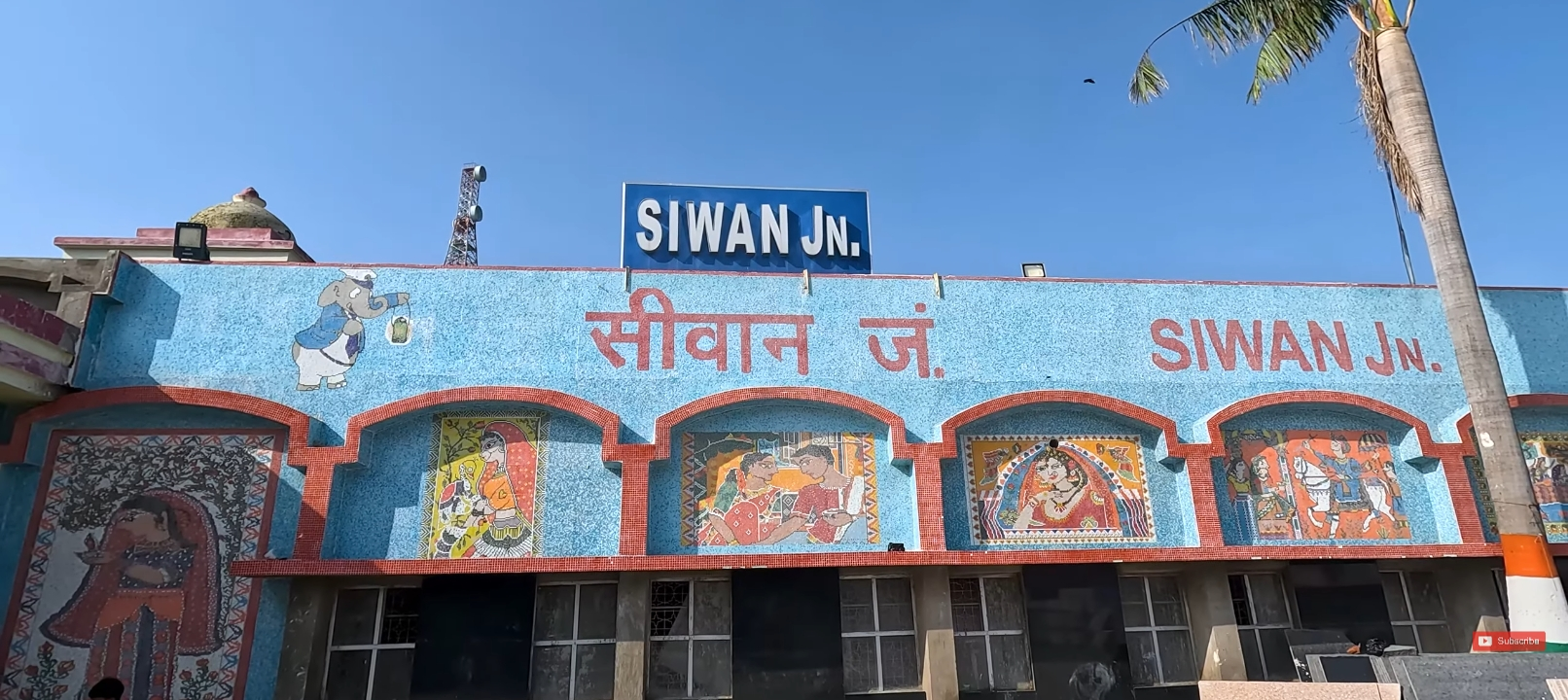
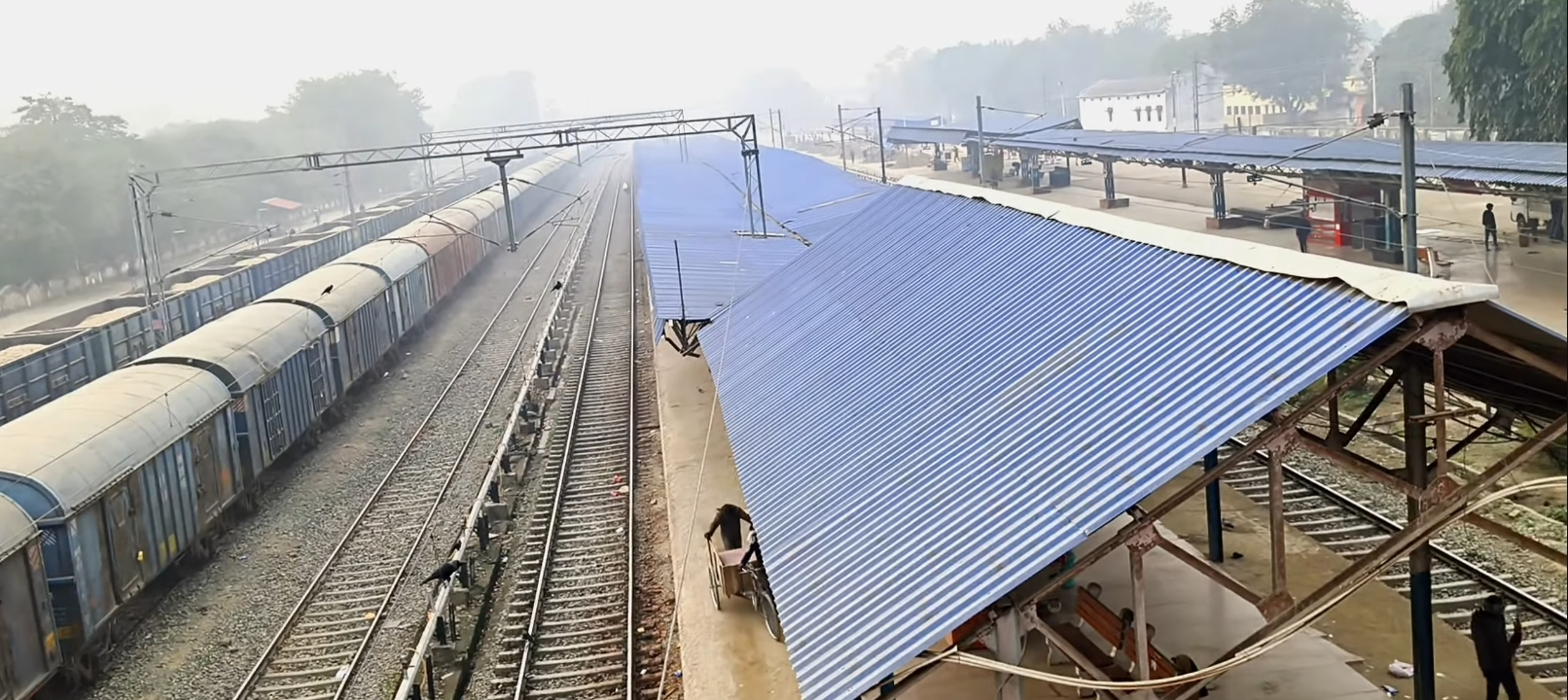

General information
- Location: Siwan, Bihar; India
- Coordinates: 26.2110°N 84.3593°E
- Elevation: 69 metres (226 ft)
- Owner: North Eastern Railway zone
- Operator: Indian Railways
- Lines: (Siwan–Gorakhpur section); (Siwan–Chhapra–Barauni section); (Siwan–Thawe-Kaptanganj section); (Siwan–Maharajganj section); (Siwan–Chhapra–Patliputra section); Siwan-Thawe-Motihari section (Sanctioned)
- Platforms: 5
- Tracks: 9
- Connections: Auto rickshaw, taxi, cab service

Construction
- Structure type: Standard (on ground station)
- Parking: Available
- Cycle facilities: Available

Other information
- Status: Functioning
- Station code: SV
- Zone(s): North Eastern Railway zone
- Division(s): Varanasi

History
- Opened: 1907; 119 years ago
- Electrified: Yes, 25 kV AC 50 Hz

Passengers
- 150,000 per day
Location
- Location within Bihar Location within India
- Interactive map

Siwan Junction (station code: SV) is an important A-category railway junction located in the city of Siwan, Siwan district in the Indian state of Bihar. It functions under the Varanasi railway division of the North Eastern Railway (NER) zone of Indian Railways. The station serves as the primary railhead for Siwan district and also caters significantly to passengers from the neighboring Gopalganj district. It is a major junction of the North Eastern Railway zone. Important trains serving this station include the Vaishali Express, Bihar Sampark Kranti Express, Arunachal AC Superfast Express, Amrapali Express, and Avadh Assam Express. Passenger trains originating from this station include the Siwan–Samastipur, Siwan–Gorakhpur, and Siwan–Thawe passenger services. In 2024–25, the station was ranked fifth among the top-earning railway stations in the North Eastern Railway zone. Another railway station in the city, Siwan Kachari railway station, is situated on the Siwan–Thawe railway section.

== History ==
Siwan Junction was opened in 1907 during the British colonial period as part of the expansion of railway infrastructure in eastern India. Over time, the station developed into a junction due to the convergence of multiple railway lines connecting Bihar with Uttar Pradesh, West Bengal, and the North-Eastern states. The station has since undergone several upgrades, including broad-gauge conversion, track doubling, and electrification, to meet rising passenger demand.

== Jurisdiction and administration ==
Siwan Junction falls under the administrative control of the Varanasi railway division of the North Eastern Railway zone.

== Redevelopment ==
Siwan Junction is being redeveloped under the Amrit Bharat Station Scheme, a national railway modernization initiative launched by the Ministry of Railways to upgrade stations across India. The redevelopment work was inaugurated on 26 February 2024 by Prime Minister Narendra Modi via video conferencing. The project has an allocated budget of approximately ₹40.13 crore.

The redevelopment aims to upgrade passenger facilities, improve station buildings and platforms, enhance circulation areas and drainage, construct foot-over bridges, and provide improved signage and public amenities. The project is scheduled for completion by March 2026.

== Trains ==
Some important trains available from Siwan railway station are as follows:

- Lalitgram - New Delhi Vaishali Express
- Bihar Sampark Kranti Express
- Naharlagun - Anand Vihar Arunachal AC Superfast Express
- Dibrugarh–Gomti Nagar Amrit Bharat Express
- Kamakhya–Gomti Nagar Superfast Express
- Dibrugarh–Chandigarh Express
- Udaipur City–Kamakhya Kavi Guru Express
- Dibrugarh - Lalgarh Avadh Assam Express
- New Jalpaiguri–Amritsar Karmabhoomi Express
- Udaipur City–New Jalpaiguri Weekly Express
- New Jalpaiguri–New Delhi Superfast Express
- Guwahati - Jammu Tawi Lohit Express
- Kamakhya–Anand Vihar Weekly Express
- Kolkata - Gorakhpur Purvanchal Express
- Howrah - Kathgodam Bagh Express
- Chhapra–Anand Vihar Terminal Amrit Bharat Express
- Mumbai LTT – Chhapra Express
- Barauni–Ernakulam Raptisagar Express
- Bhagalpur–Jammu Tawi Amarnath Express
- Tatanagar-Thawe Express
- Sitamarhi- Anand Vihar Lichchavi Express
- Saharsa-Amritsar Garib Rath Express
- Saharsa - Anand Vihar Poorbiya Express
- Gorakhpur - Sambalpur Maurya Express
- Barauni–Gwalior Mail
- Chhapra–Mathura Superfast Express
- Barauni - Jammu Tawi Mour Dhwaj Express
- Katihar - Amritsar Amrapali Express
- Jaynagar - Amritsar Shaheed Express
- Saharsa - Amritsar Jan Sadharan Express
- Chhapra–Nautanwa Intercity Express
- Purnia Court–Amritsar Jan Sewa Express
- Chhapra–Lokmanya Tilak Terminus Antyodaya Express

== Railway lines ==
Rail section	Length	Gauge / Track / Electrification	Stations
Barauni–Gorakhpur line (Siwan–Gorakhpur section)	—	Broad gauge / Double line / Electrified	* Siwan Junction: Duraundha Junction; Bhatni Junction; Deoria Sadar; Gorakhpur Junction
Chhapra–Siwan section (part of Siwan–Chhapra–Patliputra line)	—	Broad gauge / Double line / Electrified	* Siwan Junction: Duraundha Junction; Chhapra Junction
Siwan–Thawe–Kaptanganj line	—	Broad gauge / Single line / Electrified	* Siwan Junction: Pachrukhi; Maharajganj; Thawe Junction; Kaptanganj Junction
Siwan–Maharajganj line	—	Broad gauge / Single line / Electrified	* Siwan Junction: Pachrukhi; Maharajganj
