= Harihans =

- Village
- Location of Harihans in Bihar
- Country: India
- State: Bihar
- District: Siwan
- Time zone: UTC+05:30 (IST)
- Postal code: 841286
- UN/LOCODE: INBR
- ISO 3166 code: IN-BR

Harihans is a village in the Siwan district of Bihar, India. Siwan is the main railway station of this village.

== History ==
This village has a history of two princes, Hari Singh and Hans Singh, who were the Kings of Cheeroo dynasty and were living majestically. They had built a strong forte, Long Deep trench of water canals were constructed in the East called jamunia and in the North Barracks were made for protection. There was a thick dangerous forest on the west inhabited by lions and other beasts which served the natural protecting boundary for the forte. This was the ruling era of Feroz Shah Tughlaq. They were given Jagirs of 52 villages by Delhi King. So they tried to expand their area and annexed the villages of weaker Rajas and Tallukdars. Their men also became independent and started looting and plunder of agricultural crops in their neighbourhood. On receipt of intelligence information about the area, the king reprimanded several times to the Raja Hari Singh & Hans Singh but they did not change their attitude and neither could control their man to stop their misdeeds. When reports against them continued despite several serious warnings, the king decided to change the management of the state run by Hari Singh & Hans Singh.

== Rulers ==
Sheikh Azimullah Siddiqui a.k.a. Shaikh Pahar (Mountain) arrived in Delhi from Hijaz with his family in 744 AH 1325 AD in search of better opportunities, on the request of Syed Mohammad Ibrahim Saheb alias Syed Saheb while Syed Saheb met Sheikh Saheb during his previous Hajj pilgrimage in Makkah. That was the time when the raja (A prince, chief, or ruler in India) of Sheeroo Dynasty was disobeying the authority of King of Delhi, King Feroz Shah Tughlaq.

When King Feroz Shah ascended the throne in 752 AH 1351 AD, Sheikh Pahar was well known as a man of sword with Arab blood, a warrior and a strategist. When the King came to know the extraordinary qualities of Sheikh Pahar, he awarded the Hari Sing & Hans Singh District to Sheikh Saheb through an edict or decree in 762 AH/1362 AD. Further the king wrote to Raja of Majhauli to arrest Hari Singh & Hans Singh and present them in Delhi Court with the help of Sheikh Pahar. Raja Majhauli sent his commander with his army along with the royal forces under the command of Sheikh Pahar to dislodge the Talukdars (Landholders) of Harihans Taluka (District). The Caravan headed towards the fort of Hari Singh and dislodged Hari Singh & Hans Singh after a fierce fighting and Sheikh Azimullah was recognized as the new Landholder of Harihans village in addition with the administration of 52 neighbouring villages.

The present residents of village Harihans are the descendants of Noor Mohammed and Mohammed Hasan . The original script was authored by Chowdhury Sheikh Mohammad Zaki in the Family Tree of Hari Hans edited by Mashkoor Ahmad Siddiqui and translated in English by Wasif Ahmad Siddiqui, all original descendants of Harihans.
