= Jamsikari =

- Village
- Country: India
- State: Bihar
- District: Siwar

Population (2011)
  - Total: 1,197
- ISO 3166 code: IN-BR

Jamsikari is a village in Siwan district, in the Indian state of Bihar. According to the 2011 census of India, the population was 1,197 people (560 males; 637 females).
