= Hardauna =

Coordinates: 27°29′N 82°57′E

Hardauna हर्दौना
- Village
- Interactive map of Hardauna
- Nepal🇳🇵: Nepal
- Zone: Lumbini Zone
- District: Kapilvastu District

Government
  - Type: Local Government
  - Chairperson: Shailendra Kumar Chaudhary

Population (2011)
  - Total: 4,841
- Time zone: UTC+5:45 (Nepal Time)
- Postal code: 32800
- Area code: 40655

Hardauna is a village in the sub-metropolitan municipality of Maharajganj in the Kapilvastu District of the Lumbini Province. The village is in a terai region in southern Nepal. It is on the Banganga, a river which arises on the southern slopes of the Sivalik Hills and flows across the Terai, reaching into Uttar Pradesh state in India.

At the time of the 1991 Nepal census Hardauna had a population of 3,393 people living in 576 individual households. In 2011, the census of the village counted a total population of 4,841 individuals (2,324 female and 2,517 male), residing in 676 separate household.

Formerly, Hardauna was a village development committee (VDC), which were local-level administrative units. In 2017, the government of Nepal restructured local government in line with the new 2015 constitution and VDCs were discontinued.
