= Rajan Ji Maharaj =

Indian spiritual speaker and devotional singer

- Rajan Ji Maharaj

Personal life
- Born: Rajan Tiwari; 6 September 1982 (age 44) Kolkata, West Bengal, India
- Education: Scottish Church College
- Known for: Ramcharitmanas narrations, bhajans
- Occupation: Spiritual speaker, devotional singer

Religious life
- Religion: Hinduism

Religious career
- Teacher: Rambhadracharya; Prem Bhushan Ji Maharaj

Rajan Tiwari (born 6 September 1982) is an Indian spiritual speaker and devotional singer known as Rajan Ji Maharaj. He narrates the Ramcharitmanas and performs bhajans in Hindi, Bhojpuri and Maithili.

== Early life and education ==
Rajan Tiwari was born on 6 September 1982 in Kolkata to Shivji Tiwari and his family originates from Siwan district in Bihar. He completed his schooling in Kolkata and earned a B.Sc. degree in chemistry from Scottish Church College. Tiwari initially aspired to become a doctor and later pursued singing. Before entering a full-time religious career, he worked in a railway brake-shoe and component manufacturing business. Influenced by the teachings of Swami Vivekananda, Tiwari met orator Prem Bhushan Ji Maharaj in Kolkata in 2004 after a Bhojpuri cassette recorded by his brother Vinay reached the orator, and he subsequently studied Ram Katha narration under his guidance. He later received spiritual initiation from Jagadguru Rambhadracharya in Chitrakoot. In 2008 Tiwari traveled to Mumbai to participate in a singing reality show, advancing to the top 36 contestants before being eliminated prior to the final 12.

== Career and musical style ==
Tiwari began delivering public Ram Katha discourses in Howrah in 2011. Over subsequent years he conducted multi-day religious discourses across several Indian states, including Siwan and Bettiah in Bihar, Dhanbad in Jharkhand, Gorakhpur, Raebareli, Ballia and Pratapgarh in Uttar Pradesh, and Ujjain in Madhya Pradesh. His discourses combine Hindi narration of the Ramcharitmanas with devotional songs and traditional folk songs known as sohar in Bhojpuri and Maithili, focusing on themes of devotion, humility and social values.

=== Viral social media presence ===
In July 2025 a clip of his rendition of the devotional verse "Ay Ji Mangal Bhawan Amangal Haari" circulated widely on social media platforms as an internet meme, drawing attention beyond his traditional audience. He later addressed the trend humorously during a discourse and commented on how younger social media users had reinterpreted the lines. His rendition of the song "Raja Ji... Jarurat Ladna Hamar DM Ho" was also featured in a web series.

== Public incidents and commentary ==
=== 2026 Gorakhpur dispute ===
In late January 2026 a dispute occurred between local organizers and Tiwari's team over stage management during a nine-day Ram Katha at Champa Devi Park in Gorakhpur. According to media reports, members of his team faced misconduct and death threats, including threats against his children—which Tiwari said was the first such incident in his 16-year career—prompting him to consider halting the event. While addressing attendees from the stage, he condemned the threats and warned the public against individuals allegedly charging devotees ₹1,100 to arrange meetings with him, clarifying that he never charges fees for meetings. Following security assurances from local representatives, he continued the discourse, which concluded on 4 February 2026.

=== Public remarks ===
Tiwari has occasionally commented on contemporary social and political developments during his discourses, and political figures such as Raghuraj Pratap Singh have attended his events in Pratapgarh.
