= Amir Subhani =

Former Chief Secretary of Bihar

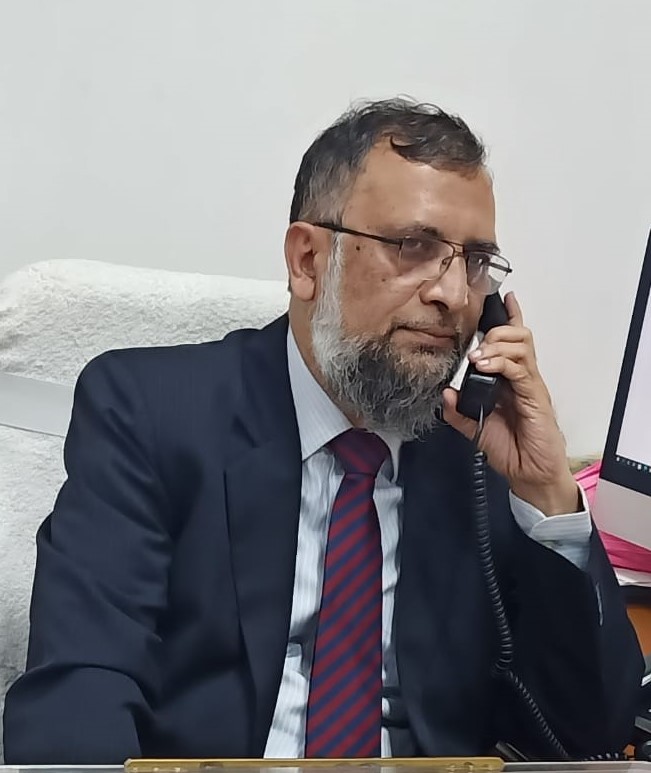

Chief Secretary, Government of Bihar
- In office 1 January 2022 – 1 March 2024
- Preceded by: Tripurari Sharan
- Succeeded by: Brajesh Mehrotra

Personal details
- Born: 10 April 1964 (age 62) Bahuara, Barharia, Siwan, Bihar
- Education: (M.A. Statistics) Patna University

Amir Subhani is a retired Indian Administrative Service (IAS) officer of 1987 batch from Bihar Cadre. He served as Chief Secretary to Government of Bihar from 1 January 2022 till 1 March 2024. Subhani was the 1987 batch UPSC-Civil Services Examination (CSE) topper securing rank 1.

== Career ==
Subhani appeared for 1987 UPSC Civil Services Examination where he topped the examination with an All India Rank of 1 leaving behind incumbent Cabinet Secretary of India T.V. Somanathan who secured an All India Rank of 2. He joined Indian Administrative Service batch of 1987 and got posted in Bihar Cadre.

Amir Subhani began his career as Sub Divisional Officer. In 1993, he was appointed as District Collector of Bhojpur district and then of Patna in 1994. In 2005, he became the Chairman of Bihar State Milk Co-operative Federation. Subhani has served in various positions in the Government of Bihar like Principal Secretary, Secretary of Home Department. On 1 January 2022, Amir Subhani took charge as the Chief Secretary of State of Bihar becoming the first chief secretary of Bihar from a minority group and served their till 1 March 2024. Since his retirement, he is serving as the chairman of Bihar Electricity Regulatory Commission.
