= Mairwa =

- City (Nagar Panchayat)
- Location in Bihar, India
- Coordinates: 26.23°N 84.15°E
- Country: India
- State: Bihar
- District: Siwan
- Subdivision: Siwan
- Block: Mairwa block

Government
  - Type: Nagar Panchayat
  - Body: Mairwa Nagar Panchayat

Area
  - Total: 6.23 km^{2} (2.41 sq mi)

Population (2011)
  - Total: 23,565
  - Density: 3,780/km^{2} (9,800/sq mi)

Languages
  - Official: Bhojpuri, Hindi & English
- Time zone: UTC+5:30 (IST)
- Vehicle registration: BR-29
- Climate: Cwa

Mairwa City Council is a nagar panchayat (city council) located in Siwan district of Bihar in India.

The total area of the council is 6.23 square kilometres (2.41 mi^{2}), and its total population is 23,565. The city is divided into 13 wards. It is the block headquarters of Mairwa block. It is famous for the historical temple of Baba Hari Ram Brahma.

== See also ==
- Siwan Subdivision
