= Maharajganj Assembly constituency =

Maharajganj Assembly constituency may refer to these state electoral constituencies in India:

- Maharajganj, Bihar Assembly constituency
- Maharajganj, Uttar Pradesh Assembly constituency

== See also ==
- Mahrajganj (disambiguation)
