= Basantpur (community development block), Siwan =

Community development block in Siwan district, Bihar, India

Basantpur
- CD Block
- Location in Bihar, India
- Coordinates: 26.16947°N 84.663°E
- Country: India
- State: Bihar
- District: Siwan
- Subdivision: Maharajganj
- Headquarters: Basantpur (town)

Government
  - Type: Community development
  - Body: Maharajganj Block

Area
  - Total: 62.22 km^{2} (24.02 sq mi)

Population (2011)
  - Total: 105,229
  - Density: 1,691/km^{2} (4,380/sq mi)

Languages
  - Official: Bhojpuri, Hindi, Urdu, English
- Time zone: UTC+5:30 (IST)

Basantpur is a Community development block and a town in district of Siwan, in Bihar state of India. It is one out of 6 blocks of Maharajganj Subdivision. The headquarter of the block is situated at Maharajganj Nagar Panchayat.

Total area of the block is 62.22 square kilometres (24.02 mi^{2}) and the total population of the block as of 2011 census of India is 105,229.

The block is divided into many Gram Panchayats and villages.

== Gram Panchayats ==
Gram panchayats of Basantpur block in Maharajganj Subdivision, Siwan district.

- Baiju barhoga
- Basant pur
- Basaon
- Kanhauli
- Kumkumpur
- Molanapur
- Rajapur
- Sareya Srikant
- Suryapura

== See also ==
- Maharajganj Subdivision
- Administration in Bihar
