= Pachlakhi =

Village in Bihar, India

Pachlakhi is a village in Siwan district, Bihar, India.
