= Administrative divisions of Bihar =

Regional divisions in Bihar

Divisions of Bihar
- Category: Administrative division
- Location: Bihar
- Number: 9
- Government: Government of Bihar
- Subdivisions: 38 Districts; 101 Subdivisions; 534 Blocks

Structurally Bihar is divided into divisions (Pramandal)), districts (Zila), sub-divisions (Anumandal) & circles (Anchal). The state is divided into 9 divisions, 38 districts, 101 subdivisions and 534 circles. 19 municipal corporations, 89 Nagar Parishads and 156 Nagar Panchayats for administrative purposes.

== Divisions ==
Details of Divisions
Map	Division	Headquarter	Area	Population^{*}2011	#District	Districts
	Tirhut	Muzaffarpur	17,147 km^{2} (6,620 sq mi)	21,356,045	6	West Champaran
	Tirhut	Muzaffarpur	17,147 km^{2} (6,620 sq mi)	21,356,045	6	East Champaran
	Tirhut	Muzaffarpur	17,147 km^{2} (6,620 sq mi)	21,356,045	6	Muzaffarpur
	Tirhut	Muzaffarpur	17,147 km^{2} (6,620 sq mi)	21,356,045	6	Sitamarhi
	Tirhut	Muzaffarpur	17,147 km^{2} (6,620 sq mi)	21,356,045	6	Sheohar
	Tirhut	Muzaffarpur	17,147 km^{2} (6,620 sq mi)	21,356,045	6	Vaishali
	Patna	Patna	16,960 km^{2} (6,550 sq mi)	17,734,739	6	Patna
	Patna	Patna	16,960 km^{2} (6,550 sq mi)	17,734,739	6	Nalanda
	Patna	Patna	16,960 km^{2} (6,550 sq mi)	17,734,739	6	Bhojpur
	Patna	Patna	16,960 km^{2} (6,550 sq mi)	17,734,739	6	Rohtas
	Patna	Patna	16,960 km^{2} (6,550 sq mi)	17,734,739	6	Buxar
	Patna	Patna	16,960 km^{2} (6,550 sq mi)	17,734,739	6	Kaimur
	Magadh	Gaya	12,345 km^{2} (4,766 sq mi)	10,931,018	5	Gaya
	Magadh	Gaya	12,345 km^{2} (4,766 sq mi)	10,931,018	5	Nawada
	Magadh	Gaya	12,345 km^{2} (4,766 sq mi)	10,931,018	5	Aurangabad
	Magadh	Gaya	12,345 km^{2} (4,766 sq mi)	10,931,018	5	Jehanabad
	Magadh	Gaya	12,345 km^{2} (4,766 sq mi)	10,931,018	5	Arwal
	Purnea	Purnea	10,009 km^{2} (3,864 sq mi)	10,838,525	4	Purnia
	Purnea	Purnea	10,009 km^{2} (3,864 sq mi)	10,838,525	4	Katihar
	Purnea	Purnea	10,009 km^{2} (3,864 sq mi)	10,838,525	4	Araria
	Purnea	Purnea	10,009 km^{2} (3,864 sq mi)	10,838,525	4	Kishanganj
	Munger	Munger	9,862 km^{2} (3,807 sq mi)	6,120,117	6	Munger
	Munger	Munger	9,862 km^{2} (3,807 sq mi)	6,120,117	6	Jamui
	Munger	Munger	9,862 km^{2} (3,807 sq mi)	6,120,117	6	Khagaria
	Munger	Munger	9,862 km^{2} (3,807 sq mi)	6,120,117	6	Lakhisarai
	Munger	Munger	9,862 km^{2} (3,807 sq mi)	6,120,117	6	Begusarai
	Munger	Munger	9,862 km^{2} (3,807 sq mi)	6,120,117	6	Sheikhpura
	Darbhanga	Darbhanga	8,684 km^{2} (3,353 sq mi)	15,652,799	3	Darbhanga
	Darbhanga	Darbhanga	8,684 km^{2} (3,353 sq mi)	15,652,799	3	Madhubani
	Darbhanga	Darbhanga	8,684 km^{2} (3,353 sq mi)	15,652,799	3	Samastipur
	Saran	Chhapra	6,893 km^{2} (2,661 sq mi)	10,819,311	3	Saran
	Saran	Chhapra	6,893 km^{2} (2,661 sq mi)	10,819,311	3	Siwan
	Saran	Chhapra	6,893 km^{2} (2,661 sq mi)	10,819,311	3	Gopalganj
	Kosi	Saharsa	5,899 km^{2} (2,277 sq mi)	6,120,117	3	Saharsa
	Kosi	Saharsa	5,899 km^{2} (2,277 sq mi)	6,120,117	3	Madhepura
	Kosi	Saharsa	5,899 km^{2} (2,277 sq mi)	6,120,117	3	Supaul
	Bhagalpur	Bhagalpur	5,589 km^{2} (2,158 sq mi)	5,061,565	2	Bhagalpur
	Bhagalpur	Bhagalpur	5,589 km^{2} (2,158 sq mi)	5,061,565	2	Banka

== Proposed Divisions ==
Division Name	Headquarter	Area	Districts
Bhojpur Division	Arrah	11,310 sq.(km)	Bhojpur District, Buxar District, Kaimur District & Rohtas District.
Champaran Division	Motihari	9,198 sq.(km)	East Champaran district, West Champaran District & Valmiki Nagar District (Proposed).

== Summary ==
Division	Headquarters	Districts	District map of Bihar
Patna	Patna	Bhojpur, Buxar, Kaimur, Patna, Rohtas, Nalanda	
Magadh	Gaya	Arwal, Aurangabad, Gaya, Jehanabad, Nawada	
Saran	Chapra	Saran, Siwan , Gopalganj	
Tirhut	Muzaffarpur	East Champaran, Muzaffarpur, Sheohar, Sitamarhi, Vaishali, West Champaran	
Purnia	Purnia	Araria, Katihar, Kishanganj, Purnia	
Bhagalpur	Bhagalpur	Banka, Bhagalpur	
Darbhanga	Darbhanga	Darbhanga, Madhubani, Samastipura	
Kosi	Saharsa	Madhepura, Saharsa, Supaul	
Munger	Munger	Begusarai,Jamui, Khagaria, Munger, Lakhisarai, Sheikhpura	

== Divisional Officers ==
Almost every department of Bihar Government has its divisional level officers who supervise, review and guide its district level officers. There are many important divisional level committees and meetings chaired by concerned Divisional Commissioner which take inter-departmental decisions such as divisional crime and law & order review meeting, divisional security committee, divisional level monitoring committee for development work, regional transport authority etc. The below is a comparative table of state government department officials at various divisions of Bihar at division, district, sub division and block level..

== See also ==
- Government of Bihar
- Administration in Bihar
- Cities in Bihar
- Districts of Bihar
- Divisions of India
- Subdivisions of Bihar
- Blocks in Bihar
- Villages in Bihar
