= Daha River =

River in Bihar

Daha River दाहा नदी

Location
- Country: India
- State: Bihar
- District: Gopalganj, Siwan, Saran

Physical characteristics
- Source: Artesian well
  - location: Sasamusa Chaur
  - elevation: 200 m (660 ft)
- Mouth: Ghaghara
  - location: Phulwariya, Tajpur, Saran
  - coordinates: 25°53′59″N 84°29′28″E
  - elevation: 50 m (160 ft)
- Length: 96 km (60 mi)

Basin features
- Cities: Siwan

The Daha River (Bhojpuri: 𑂘𑂰𑂯𑂰 𑂢𑂘𑂲 ) is a seasonal river that originates from an artesian well in a marshy area of Sasamusa Chaur in Gopalganj district in the state of Bihar in India. It flows as a small, perennial stream, covering about 96 km (60 mi) through the Gopalganj, Siwan, and Chhapra districts, before joining the Ghaghra River near Chhapra. The river condition is critical due to encroachment, illegal construction and water pollution. Pollution of the river began largely in the 1980s, largely as a result of farming as well as the presence of a sugar mill in the region, and has continued ever since.

== Mythological importance ==
According to the Ramayana, when Sita was thirsty, she asked Lakshmana for water. Lakshmana shot his arrow at the ground and water come out from the place, which is why it was historically known as Baanganga.

== Case in NGT ==
Several petition are filed in NGT for conservation of this river. As per latest report, NGT has asked govt of Bihar for clarification.

== Conservation efforts ==
DPR has been prepared for conservation of this river by DM and district water department and is awaiting approval from government of Bihar.
