= Bhagwanpur Hat =

Community development block in Siwan district, Bihar, India

- CD block
- Location in Bihar, India
- Coordinates: 26.08685°N 84.67999°E
- Country: India
- State: Bihar
- District: Siwan
- Subdivision: Maharajganj
- Headquarters: town

Government
  - Type: Community development
  - Body: Bhagwanpur Hat Block

Area
  - Total: 149.40 km^{2} (57.68 sq mi)

Population (2011)
  - Total: 220,651
  - Density: 1,476.9/km^{2} (3,825.2/sq mi)

Languages
  - Official: Bhojpuri, Hindi, Urdu, English
- Time zone: UTC+5:30 (IST)

Bhagwanpur Hat is a community development block and a town in Siwan district, in Bihar state of India. It is one of the six blocks that comprise Maharajganj Subdivision. The headquarter of the block is at Bhagwanpur Hat town.

The block's total area is 149.40 square kilometres (57.68 mi^{2}) and the total population as of the 2011 census of India is 220,651.

The block is divided into many gram panchayats (village councils) and villages.

== Gram panchayats ==
Gram panchayats of Bhagwanpur Hat block in Maharajganj Subdivision, Siwan district:.

- Balahan arazi
- Bansohi
- Barka gaon
- Bhikhampur
- Bilaspur

A major village Dharamraj

- Bithuna
- Brahmasthan
- Gopalpur
- Kauria
- Kherwa
- Mahamada
- Mahamadpur
- Mirjumala
- Morakhas
- Sagar Sultanpur dakshin
- Sagar Sultanpur uttar
- Sahasaraon
- Sankarpur
- Saraya parauli
- Sondhani

== See also ==
- Maharajganj Subdivision
- Administration in Bihar

(MAKHDUMPUR IN SIWAN BIHAR))
