= Bhopatpur =

Coordinates: 24°53′N 80°06′E

Bhopatpur is a village in Kaushambi district, Uttar Pradesh, India.
