= Darauli =

Community development block in Siwan district, Bihar, India

- CD Block
- Location in Bihar, India
- Coordinates: 26.0774°N 84.1316°E
- Country: India
- State: Bihar
- District: Siwan
- Subdivision: Siwan
- Headquarters: Darauli (town)

Government
  - Type: Community development
  - Body: Darauli block

Area
  - Total: 172.80 km^{2} (66.72 sq mi)
- Elevation: 70 m (230 ft)

Population (2011)
  - Total: 174,357
  - Density: 1,009.0/km^{2} (2,613.3/sq mi)

Languages
  - Official: Bhojpuri, Hindi, Urdu, English
- Time zone: UTC+5:30 (IST)
- PIN: 841234

Darauli is a community development block and a town in district of Siwan, in Bihar state of India. It is one of 13 blocks of Siwan Subdivision. The headquarters of the block is at Darauli town.

The total area of the block is 172.80 square kilometres (66.72 mi^{2}) and the total population of the block as of the 2011 census of India is 174,357.

The block is divided into many gram panchayats and villages.

== Gram panchayats ==
The following are the gram panchayats of Darauli block in Siwan subdivision, Siwan district.

- Amarpur
- Balahun
- Belaon
- Chakari
- Daraili mathia
- Darauli
- Don bujurg
- Dumrahar bujurg
- Harnatar
- Karom
- Kashila pachhbenia
- Krishnapali
- Kumti bhitauli
- Sarharwa
- Sarna
- Tiyar

== Darauli (town) ==
Darauli is a village/town in Darauli gram panchayat of Darauli block. It is located south-west of Siwan, the district headquarters. It is 38 km from Siwan, via Mairwa. The town is situated at the bank of the Ghaghra river.

The total area of the town is 458 hectares (4.58 km^{2}) and the total population is 10,073.

== See also ==
- Siwan subdivision
- Administration in Bihar
- Dronacharya Gurukul
