= Panchrukhi =

Community development block in Siwan district, Bihar, India

Pachrukhi
- CD Block
- Location in Bihar, India
- Coordinates: 26°9′28.93″N 84°24′56.81″E
- Country: India
- State: Bihar
- District: Siwan
- Subdivision: Siwan
- Headquarters: Pachrukhi (town)

Government
  - Type: Community development
  - Body: Pachrukhi Block

Area
  - Total: 124.33 km^{2} (48.00 sq mi)

Population (2011)
  - Total: 201,753
  - Density: 1,622.7/km^{2} (4,202.8/sq mi)

Languages
  - Official: Bhojpuri, Hindi, Urdu, English
- Time zone: UTC+5:30 (IST)
- Postal code: 841242
- Telephone code: 841241

Pachrukhi is a Community development block and a town in Siwan district, in Bihar state of India. It is one of the 13 blocks which comprise Siwan Subdivision. The headquarter of the block is at Pachrukhi town.

The total area of the block is 124.33 square kilometres (48.00 mi^{2}) and the total population as of the 2011 census of India is 201,759.

The block is divided into many Gram Panchayats and villages.

== Gram Panchayats ==
Gram panchayats of Panchrukhi block in Siwan Subdivision, Siwan district.

- Bharatpura
- Bhatwaliya
- Bindusar bujurg
- Gopal pur
- Hardiya
- Jasauli
- Mahuari
- Makhanupur
- Pachrukhi
- Papaur
- Pipra
- Sahlour
- Sarauti
- Shambhopur
- Supauli
- Surbala
- Tarwara
- Ukhai

== See also ==
- Administration in Bihar
