= Dindayalpur =

Coordinates: 25°21′N 83°01′E

Dindayalpur is a village situated in Varanasi district of Uttar Pradesh state, India.

== Financial and public institutions ==
Punjab National Bank, Bank of Baroda, State Bank of India, icici, Axis bank, Allahabad bank, union bank, central bank, HDFC Bank has a branch situated in Dindayalpur.
