= Siswan =

Community development block in Siwan district, Bihar, India

- CD Block
- Location in Bihar, India
- Coordinates: 25.9407°N 84.39757°E
- Country: India
- State: Bihar
- District: Siwan
- Subdivision: Siwan
- Headquarters: Siswan (town)

Government
  - Type: Community development
  - Body: Siswan Block

Area
  - Total: 115.78 km^{2} (44.70 sq mi)

Population (2011)
  - Total: 153,953
  - Density: 1,329.7/km^{2} (3,443.9/sq mi)

Languages
  - Official: Bhojpuri, Hindi, Urdu, English
- Time zone: UTC+5:30 (IST)

Siswan is a Community development block and a town in district of Siwan, in Bihar state of India. It is one out of 13 blocks of Siwan Subdivision. The headquarter of the block is at Siswan town.

Total area of the block is 115.78 square kilometres (44.70 mi^{2}) and the total population of the block as of 2011 census of India is 153,953.

The block is divided into many Gram Panchayats and villages.

== See also ==
- Administration in Bihar
