= Sadarpur =

Sadar Pur
- Village
- Location within Uttar Pradesh
- Coordinates: 28°31′N 79°33′E
- Country: India
- State: Uttar Pradesh
- District: Bareilly
- Named for: Sadr Jahaan

Population (Census 2011)
  - Total: 1,016

Languages
  - Official: Hindi
- Time zone: UTC+5:30 (IST)
- PIN: 2340500
- Nearest city: Nawabganj, Bareilly
- Literacy: 62%
- cold: cold (Köppen)

Sadarpur is a village in Nawabganj of Bareilly district, in Uttar Pradesh, India.
