= Bhatni, Bhopal =

Bhatni
- village
- Location within Madhya Pradesh Location within India
- Coordinates: 23.761932°N 77.277453°E
- Country: India
- State: Madhya Pradesh
- District: Bhopal
- Tehsil: Berasia

Population (2011)
  - Total: 732
- Time zone: UTC+5:30 (IST)
- ISO 3166 code: IN-MP
- Census code: 482067

Bhatni is a village in the Bhopal district of Madhya Pradesh, India. It is located in the Berasia tehsil.

== Demographics ==
According to the 2011 census of India, Bhatni has 172 households. The effective literacy rate (i.e. the literacy rate of population excluding children aged 6 and below) is 56.44%.

Demographics (2011 Census)
	Total	Male	Female
Population	732	372	360
Children aged below 6 years	165	93	72
Scheduled caste	55	29	26
Scheduled tribe	0	0	0
Literates	320	212	108
Workers (all)	357	189	168
Main workers (total)	188	178	10
Main workers: Cultivators	65	61	4
Main workers: Agricultural labourers	114	111	3
Main workers: Household industry workers	5	5	0
Main workers: Other	4	1	3
Marginal workers (total)	169	11	158
Marginal workers: Cultivators	3	2	1
Marginal workers: Agricultural labourers	162	8	154
Marginal workers: Household industry workers	1	0	1
Marginal workers: Others	3	1	2
Non-workers	375	183	192
