= Goriakothi =

Community development block in Siwan district, Bihar, India

- CD Block
- Location in Bihar, India
- Coordinates: 26.253333°N 84.6075°E
- Country: India
- State: Bihar
- District: Siwan
- Subdivision: Maharajganj
- Headquarters: Goriakothi (town)

Government
  - Type: Community development
  - Body: Goriyakothi Block

Area
  - Total: 138 km^{2} (53 sq mi)

Population (2011)
  - Total: 223,709
  - Density: 1,620/km^{2} (4,200/sq mi)

Languages
  - Official: Bhojpuri, Hindi, Urdu, English
- Time zone: UTC+5:30 (IST)

Goriakothi is a community development block and a town in district of Siwan, in the Bihar state of India. It is one of six blocks in the Maharajganj Subdivision. The headquarters of the block is in Goriyakothi town.

The total area of the block is 138 square kilometres (53 mi^{2}), and the total population of the block as of the 2011 census of India is 223,709.

The block is divided into many Gram Panchayats and villages.

== Gram Panchayats ==
The Gram Panchayats in the Goriyakothi block are:

- Ageyan
- Barhoga pursotim
- Bhithi
- Bindawal
- Dudhara
- Goriyakothi
- Hariharpur kala
- Harpur
- Hetimpur
- Jamo
- Karnpura
- Lilaru aurangabad
- Mahamadpur
- Majhawaliya
- Mustafabad
- Sadipura
- Saidpura
- Sani Basantpur
- Sarari dakshin
- Sarari uttar
- Satwar
- Sisai

== See also ==
- Maharajganj Subdivision
- Administration in Bihar
