= Raghunathpur, Siwan =

Community development block in Siwan district, Bihar, India

Raghunathpur
- CD Block
- Location in Bihar, India
- Coordinates: 26°0′4.54″N 84°16′16.07″E
- Country: India
- State: Bihar
- District: Siwan
- Subdivision: Siwan
- Headquarters: Raghunathpur (town)

Government
  - Type: Community development
  - Body: Raghunathpur Block

Area
  - Total: 156.03 km^{2} (60.24 sq mi)

Population (2011)
  - Total: 157,694
  - Density: 1,010.7/km^{2} (2,617.6/sq mi)

Languages
  - Official: Bhojpuri, Hindi, Urdu, English
- Time zone: UTC+5:30 (IST)

Raghunathpur is a Community development block and a town in district of Siwan, in Bihar state of India. It is one out of 13 blocks of Siwan Subdivision. The headquarter of the block is at Raghunathpur town.

The total area of the block is 156.03 square kilometres (60.24 mi^{2}) and the total population of the block as of 2011 census of India is 157,694.

From Raghunathpur Andar is in north direction and same road leads to district head quarter Siwan.

North direction of Raghunathpur Holi river Sarju blows.

The block is divided into many Gram Panchayats and villages.

== Gram Panchayats ==
Gram panchayats of Raghunathpur block in Siwan Subdivision, Siwan district.

- Badua
- Chakari
- Dighwalia
- Gabhirar
- Gopi Patiaon
- Karsar
- Khujwan
- Kushahara
- Narhan
- Nikhti kala
- Panjwar
- Phulwaria
- Raghunath pur
- Rajpur
- Santhi
- Tari

== Notable people ==
- Manoj Bhawuk
- Ramdev Singh
- Subedar Major Bipin Bihari Singh

== See also ==
- Siwan Subdivision
- Administration in Bihar
