= Lakri Nabiganj =

Community development block in Siwan district, Bihar, India

- CD Block
- Location in Bihar, India
- Coordinates: 26.23254°N 84.71319°E
- Country: India
- State: Bihar
- District: Siwan
- Subdivision: Maharajganj
- Headquarters: Lakri Nabiganj (town)

Government
  - Type: Community development
  - Body: Lakri Nabiganj Block

Area
  - Total: 95.21 km^{2} (36.76 sq mi)

Population (2011)
  - Total: 128,899
  - Density: 1,354/km^{2} (3,506/sq mi)

Languages
  - Official: Bhojpuri, Hindi, Urdu, English
- Time zone: UTC+5:30 (IST)

Lakri Nabiganj is a Community development block and a town in district of Siwan, in Bihar state of India. It is one out of 6 blocks of Maharajganj Subdivision. The headquarter of the block is at Lakri Nabiganj town.

Total area of the block is 95.21 square kilometres (36.76 mi^{2}) and the total population of the block as of 2011 census of India is 128,899.

The block is divided into many Village Councils and villages.

== Gram Panchayats ==
Gram panchayats of Lakri Nabiganj block in Maharajganj Subdivision, Siwan district.

- Baldiha
- Basauli
- Bhada khurd
- Bhopat pur
- Dumara
- Gopalpur
- Jagatpur
- Khawashpur
- Lakari
- Lakhanaura
- Parauli

== See also ==
- Maharajganj Subdivision
- Administration in Bihar

Village--Imadpur
