= Andar (community development block) =

Community development block in Siwan district, Bihar, India

- CD Block
- Location in Bihar, India
- Coordinates: 26.1018°N 84.2905°E
- Country: India
- State: Bihar
- District: Siwan
- Subdivision: Siwan
- Headquarters: Andar (town)

Government
  - Type: Community development
  - Body: Andar block

Area
  - Total: 120.41 km^{2} (46.49 sq mi)

Population (2011)
  - Total: 110,027
  - Density: 913.77/km^{2} (2,366.7/sq mi)

Languages
  - Official: Bhojpuri, Hindi, Urdu, English
- Time zone: UTC+5:30 (IST)
- Sex ratio: 919 per 1000 ♂/♀

Andar is a community development block and a town in Siwan district of Bihar in India. It is one of 13 blocks of Siwan subdivision. The headquarters of the block is located in Andar town.

The total area of the block is 120.41 square kilometres (46.49 mi^{2}) and the total population is 110,027. Andar block is divided into many villages and they are grouped into gram panchayats.

== Gram panchayats ==
List of panchayats in Andar block:

- Andar (Nagar Panchayat)
- Arkpur
- Asaon
- Balia
- Bhawrajpur
- Jaijor
- Jamalpur
- Kherhai
- Manpur Pateji
- Patar
- Sahsaraon

== See also ==
- Siwan subdivision
- Administration in Bihar
