= Siwan subdivision =

Administrative subdivision in Siwan district, Bihar, India

Siwan subdivision is one two subdivisions of Siwan district (out of 101 subdivisions of Bihar). It comprises 13 blocks of Siwan. The total area of the subdivision is 1,536.18 square kilometres (593.12 sq mi) and total population is 2,288,559.

== Blocks of Siwan subdivision ==
CD block	Area (km^{2})	Population (2011)
Andar	120.41	110,027
Barharia	177.27	321,292
Darauli	172.80	174,357
Guthani	91.70	128,155
Hasanpura	96.56	149,580
Hussainganj	85.37	182,794
Mairwa	69.17	113,499
Nautan	65.39	90,714
Panchrukhi (Community development block)	124.33	201,759
Raghunathpur (Community development block)	156.03	157,694
Siswan (Community development block)	115.78	153,953
Siwan (Community development block)	137.34	340,983
Ziradei (Community development block)	124.03	163,752
