= Daraundha =

Community development block in Siwan district, Bihar, India

Daraunda
- CD Block
- Location in Bihar, India
- Coordinates: 26.08426°N 84.45919°E
- Country: India
- State: Bihar
- District: Siwan
- Subdivision: Maharajganj
- Headquarters: Daraunda town

Government
  - Type: Community development
  - Body: Daraunda Block

Area
  - Total: 126.60 km^{2} (48.88 sq mi)

Population (2011)
  - Total: 173,200
  - Density: 1,368/km^{2} (3,543/sq mi)

Languages
  - Official: Bhojpuri, Hindi, Urdu, English
- Time zone: UTC+5:30 (IST)

Daraunda or Duraundha/Daraundha is a Community development block in district of Siwan, in Bihar state of India. It is one out of 6 blocks of Maharajganj Subdivision. The headquarter of the block is at Daraunda town.

Total area of the block is 126.60 square kilometres (48.88 mi^{2}) and the total population of the block as of 2011 census of India is 1,73,200.

The block is divided into many Village Councils and villages.

== Panchayats ==
The block is divided into many Gram panchayats (Village councils).

- Bagoura
- Bal Bangara
- Chherahi
- Harsar
- Jalalpur
- Karsaut
- Kathua Sarangpur
- Korari Kala
- Marasara
- Pakawalia
- Pandeypur
- Pinarthu Khurd
- Ramgarha
- Ramsapur
- Rasulpur
- Rukundipur
- Sirsawn

== See also ==
- Maharajganj Subdivision
- Administration in Bihar
