= Hussainganj, Siwan =

Community development block in Siwan district, Bihar, India

Hussainganj
- CD Block
- Location in Bihar, India
- Coordinates: 26°8′37.23″N 84°19′29.82″E
- Country: India
- State: Bihar
- District: Siwan
- Subdivision: Siwan
- Headquarters: Hussainganj (town)

Government
  - Type: Community development
  - Body: Hussainganj block

Area
  - Total: 85.37 km^{2} (32.96 sq mi)

Population (2011)
  - Total: 182,794
  - Density: 2,141/km^{2} (5,546/sq mi)

Languages
  - Official: Bhojpuri, Hindi, Urdu, English
- Time zone: UTC+5:30 (IST)

Hussainganj is a community development block and a town in district of Siwan, in Bihar state of India. It is one of 13 blocks of Siwan subdivision. The headquarters of the block is at Hussainganj town.

The total area of the block is 85.37 square kilometres (32.96 mi^{2}) and the total population of the block as of the 2011 census of India is 1,82,794.

The block is divided into many gram panchayats and villages.

== Gram panchayats ==
The following are the gram panchayats of Hussainganj block in Siwan subdivision, Siwan district.

- Badram
- Baghauni
- Rasulpur
- Chapia bujurg
- Chhata
- Gopalpur
- Habib nagar
- Hathaura
- Khanpur khairati
- Kharsanda
- Machakana
- Markan
- Pratap pur
- Paschimi harihans
- Purvi harihans
- Sidhwal

== See also ==
- Administration in Bihar
