= Saran division =

Administrative division in Bihar, India

Saran division 𑂮𑂰𑂩𑂢 𑂣𑂹𑂩𑂧𑂢𑂹𑂠𑂪
- Division of Bihar
- Location of Saran division in Bihar
- Coordinates: 25.7848°N 84.7274°E
- Country: India
- State: Bihar
- Region: Bhojpur
- Headquarters: Chhapra
- Districts: Saran, Siwan, Gopalganj District

Government
  - Commissioner: Narmdeshwar Lal [Additional Charge]

Population (2011)
  - Total: 9,819,311
- Website: sarandivision.bih.nic.in

Saran division is an administrative cum sub region of broader Bhojpuri region in the state of Bihar. Chhapra is the administrative headquarters of the division. Currently (2005), the division consists of Saran district, also called Chhapra District, Siwan district, Gopalganj district.This is the only division in Bihar, in which all the districts share a boundary with another state; Uttar Pradesh.

== See also ==
- Divisions of Bihar
- Districts of Bihar
