= Maharajganj, Siwan =

Maharajganj/𑂧𑂯𑂰𑂩𑂰𑂔𑂏𑂁𑂔
- Town (Nagar Panchayat)
- Location in Bihar, India
- Coordinates: 26.1075°N 84.5025°E
- Country: India
- State: Bihar
- District: Siwan
- Subdivision: Maharajganj
- Block: Maharajganj

Government
  - Type: City council (Nagar Panchayat)
  - Body: Maharajganj city

Area
  - Total: 7.60 km^{2} (2.93 sq mi)
- Elevation: 66 m (217 ft)

Population (2001)
  - Total: 24,282
  - Density: 3,200/km^{2} (8,280/sq mi)

Languages
  - Official: Bhojpuri/𑂦𑂷𑂔𑂣𑂳𑂩𑂲, Hindi And ENGLISH
- Time zone: UTC+5:30 (IST)
- PIN: 841238
- Lok Sabha constituency: Maharajganj
- Vidhan Sabha constituency: Maharajganj

Maharajganj City Council (Maharajganj Nagar Panchayat) is a Nagar Panchayat (City council) located in Siwan district of the Indian state of Bihar.

== Demographics ==
Religions in Maharajganj, siwan
| Religion | Percent |
| Hindus | 83.40% |
| Muslims | 16.34% |
| Others | 0.08% |

As of 2011 India census, Maharajganj was provisionally reported to have a population of 24,282 of which 12,471 are males while 11,811 are females as per report released by Census India 2011. Population of Children with age of 0-6 is 3642 which is 15.00% of total population of Maharajganj (NP). In Maharajganj Nagar Panchayat, Female Sex Ratio is of 947 against state average of 918. The Child Sex Ratio in Maharajganj is around 972 compared to Bihar state average of 935. Literacy rate of Maharajganj city is 73.55% higher than state average of 61.80%. In Maharajganj, male literacy is around 81.65% while female literacy rate is 64.96%.

== Transport ==
Maharajganj railway station is connected to nearby Siwan Junction, which is connected directly to major cities. Duraundha junction connects with nearby cities like Siwan, Chapra, Patna, Varanasi, Gorakhpur and New Delhi. A new rail route from Maharajganj to Mashrakh has been completed and was inaugurated by the then union minister of state Manoj sinha in October 2018. Maharajganj is connected by road to the nearby cities like Siwan, Chapra, Varanasi, Patna, and Motihari. Many private and state transport buses provide other options.

== Education ==
- Saraswati Vidya Mandir, Keshav Nagar
- Kendriya Vidyalaya Maharajganj
- Gorakh Singh College and School, Maharajganj
- USCD DAV Public School, St Joseph's High school Maharajganj
- Uma shankar high School, Maharajganj
- Many Governments Schools

== Electoral constituencies ==
- Maharajganj (Bihar Lok Sabha constituency), India
- Maharajganj, Siwan (Vidhan Sabha constituency), Bihar, India
