= Nautan =

Community development block in Siwan district, Bihar, India

- CD block
- Location in Bihar, India
- Coordinates: 26.3280429°N 84.2160228°E
- Country: India
- State: Bihar
- District: Siwan
- Subdivision: Siwan
- Headquarters: Nautan

Government
  - Type: Community development
  - Body: Nautan block

Area
  - Total: 65.39 km^{2} (25.25 sq mi)

Population (2011)
  - Total: 90,714
  - Density: 1,387/km^{2} (3,593/sq mi)

Languages
  - Official: Bhojpuri, Hindi, Urdu, English
- Time zone: UTC+5:30 (IST)

Nautan is a community development block and a town of Siwan district in the Indian state of Bihar. It is one of 13 blocks of Siwan subdivision.

The total area of the block is 65.39 square kilometres (25.25 mi^{2}) and the total population of the block is 90,714 as of the 2011 census of India. Nautan town is the headquarters of the block.

Nautan block is divided into many gram panchayats and villages.

== Politics ==
It is part of the Ziradei Assembly constituency.

== Gram panchayats ==
The gram panchayats of Nautan block are:

- Angouta
- Gambhirpur
- Khalawa
- Khap banakat
- Mathia
- Murarpatti
- Narakatia
- Nautan
- Semaria

== See also ==
- Siwan subdivision
- Administration in Bihar
