= Mairwa (community development block) =

Community development block in Siwan district, Bihar, India

- CD block
- Location in Bihar, India
- Coordinates: 26.23°N 84.15°E
- Country: India
- State: Bihar
- District: Siwan
- Subdivision: Siwan
- Headquarters: Mairwa

Government
  - Type: Community development
  - Body: Mairwa block

Area
  - Total: 69.17 km^{2} (26.71 sq mi)
- Elevation: 65 m (213 ft)

Population (2011)
  - Total: 113,499
  - Density: 1,641/km^{2} (4,250/sq mi)

Languages
  - Official: Bhojpuri, Hindi
- Time zone: UTC+5:30 (IST)
- Postal code: 841239
- Lok Sabha constituency: Siwan
- Vidhan Sabha constituency: Ziradei

Mairwa community development block (CD block) or Mairwa block is a notified area (community development block) in Siwan district in the Indian state of Bihar. It is one of 13 blocks of Siwan subdivision that touches Border with Uttar Pradesh .

The total area of the block is 69.17 square kilometres (26.71 mi^{2}) and the total population of the block is 113,499. Mairwa city is the headquarters of this block.

It also having significant cultural influence all around because of BABA HARIRAM TEMPLE in Mairwa Dham and it was there for last 418 years.

== Panchayats in Mairwa block ==
The block is divided into one nagar panchayat (urban) and many gram panchayats (rural).

- Mairwa Nagar Panchayat (Town council)
- Muriyari
- Sewatapur
- Babhanauli
- Bargaon
- Barka manjha
- English
- Kabirpur
- Semara

=== Villages in Mairwa ===
Some villages of Mairwa block in different panchayats are:

- Nautan More
- Mairwa Dham
- Sumerpur
- Kaithwali
- Baraso
- Bargaon
- Bilaspur
- Bhopatpura
- Kabirpur
- Kabita
- Parasia
- Pipra
- Anugrah Nagar
- Shemra
- Lakshmipur
- Englis
- Nawada
- Korara

== Geography ==
Mairwa, situated in the western part of Bihar, borders the Indian state of Uttar Pradesh. It was originally a block of Siwan district, approximately 20 km from Siwan which in ancient days formed a part of Kosala Kingdom. It is geographically situated at 25º35 North and 84º1 to 84º20 East. Mairwa is bounded on the east by the Siwan district headquarters, on the north by Gopalganj district and on the west and south by two districts of Uttar Pradesh: Deoria and Ballia.

== Educational institutions ==
- Sanskriti International School
- Rose Bud Public School
- Divine Public School
- Vivekanand Kendriya Vidyalaya
- RBT Vidyalaya
- Hari Ram High School
- Hari Ram College
- Government Middle School
- Kanya High School
- Project High School
- I.T.I Mahindra College
- M.S. College
- Rama Institute of Technical Degree College
- Town high school
