= Bhatni Bazar =

- Town
- Location in Uttar Pradesh, India
- Coordinates: 26.22°N 83.57°E
- Country: India
- State: Uttar Pradesh
- District: Deoria
- Elevation: 57 m (187 ft)

Population (2015)
  - Total: 18,000

Languages
  - Official: Hindi, Bhojpuri
- Time zone: UTC+5:30 (IST)
- PIN: 274701

Bhatni Bazar is a town and a Nagar Panchayat in the Deoria district in the Indian state of Uttar Pradesh. It is the headquarter of the Bhatni development block.

== Economy ==
Bhatni Bazar is divided into two markets: the first is Nooriganj Bazar, which contained a sugar mill and was built by Noori Mian circa 1919. The other is the large Hatwa Bazar. The sugar mill in the past and a railway connection named Bhatni Junction near the markets contributed to the location's economic and social significance.

== Geography ==
Nearby settlements include small towns and villages such as Jigina Mishra, Khoribari, Rampur, Balua, Afghan, and Ghantee, Bazar in the North, Peokol, Bharauli, and Bharthua in the South, Uska, Nonapar, Bharhe, Chaura and Sawrezi in the East and Noonkhar, Pipra-Devraj, Mishrauli Dixit and Jigna Dixit in the West.

== Demographics ==
As of the 2001 census, Bhatni Bazar had a population of 14,381. Males constituted 52% of the population and females 48%. The town had an average literacy rate of 64%, higher than the national average of 59.5%; with a male literacy rate of 76% and a female literacy rate of 52%. 16% of the population is under 6.

== Language ==
The people of Bhatni speak Bhojpuri and Hindi, although English is increasingly used by younger people of the area.

== Education ==
Two private colleges offer degrees: Sita Devi Mahavidyalaya and Bahadur Yadav Memorial College, Nasima Begum Mahila Maha Vidyalay Dharkhor Babu Ghanti Deoria (affiliated to University of Gorakhpur). Subhash Intermediate College is in the heart of the city. It is one of the oldest nearby colleges. A government Junior High School is located in Hatwa.

== Government ==
Both Bhatni and Nagar Panchayat have often been important for the politics of their Chairmanship elections. Urmila Devi was the first woman chair. Balram Jaiswal is chair of Bhatni Nagar Panchayat. Bhatni is a block development council (BDC). Members are elected by voters of each ward, and are called BDC members. Chairs are elected by the ward member of BDC.

== Transportation ==
Bhatni Junction Railway Station (BTT) is located in Bhatni town it's operated by Gorakhpur railway division. Many passenger and express train halting in the railway station.
