= Maharajganj, Nepal =

Maharajganj महाराजगञ्ज Maharijgha
- Municipality
- Location in Nepal
- Coordinates: 27.56°N 82.97°E
- Country: Nepal
- Province: Lumbini
- District: Kapilvastu

Government
  - Mayor: Abdul Kalam Khan
  - Deputy Mayor: Rita kumari Kurmi

Population (1991)
  - Total: 4,590
- Time zone: UTC+5:45 (Nepal Time)
- Website: maharajgunjmun.gov.np

Maharajganj is a former village development committee that is now a Municipality in Kapilvastu District in the Lumbini Province of southern Nepal. At the time of the 1991 Nepal census it had a population of 10,454 people living in 1779 individual households. A small flood in 1993 ruined a marginal amount of cropland.
