= Maharajganj (community development block) =

Community development block in Siwan district, Bihar, India

- CD Block
- Location in Bihar, India
- Coordinates: 26°6′27″N 84°30′9″E
- Country: India
- State: Bihar
- District: Siwan
- Subdivision: Maharajganj
- Headquarters: Maharajganj

Government
  - Type: Community development
  - Body: Maharajganj Block

Area
  - Total: 115.48 km^{2} (44.59 sq mi)

Population (2011)
  - Total: 190,217
  - Density: 1,647.2/km^{2} (4,266.2/sq mi)

Languages
  - Official: Bhojpuri, Hindi, Urdu, English
- Time zone: UTC+5:30 (IST)

Maharajganj is a Community development block in district of Siwan, in Bihar state of India. It is one out of 6 blocks of Maharajganj Subdivision. The headquarter of the block is at Maharajganj town.

Total area of the block is 115.48 square kilometres (44.59 mi^{2}) and the total population of the block as of 2011 census of India is 190,217.

The block is divided into one Nagar Panchayat and many Village Councils and villages.

== Panchayats ==
Maharajganj block is divided into one Nagar Panchayat (City council) and many Gram panchayats (Village councils).

- Maharajganj (city council)
- Balau
- Balia
- Deoria
- Hajpurwa
- Jigrahawa
- Kasdeura
- Madhopur
- Paterha
- Pokhara
- Risaura
- Sarangpur
- Shivdah
- Sikatia
- Takipur
- Teghra
- Tewtha

== See also ==
- Administration in Bihar
