= Maharajganj subdivision =

Administrative subdivision in Siwan district, Bihar, India

Maharajganj Subdivision is a subdivision out of two subdivisions of Siwan district (One out of 101 Subdivisions of Bihar). It comprises 6 Blocks of Siwan. Maharajganj Subdivision comprises 686.91 square kilometres (265.22 mi^{2}) of area and the population of the subdivision (according to the 2011 census of India) is 10,41,905 individuals.

== Blocks of Maharajganj Subdivision ==
C.D. Block	Area (KM^{2})	Population (2011)
Lakri Nabiganj	95.21	1,28,899
Goriakothi	138	223,709
Basantpur	62.22	1,05,229
Bhagwanpur Hat	149.40	2,20,651
Maharajganj	115.48	1,90,217
Daraundha	126.60	1,73,200
