= Siwan (community development block) =

Community development block in Siwan district, Bihar, India

Siwan सिवान
- CD Block
- Location in Bihar, India
- Coordinates: 26.226207°N 84.345253°E
- Country: India
- State: Bihar
- District: Siwan
- Subdivision: Siwan
- Headquarters: Siwan

Government
  - Type: Community development
  - Body: Siwan Block

Area
  - Total: 137.34 km^{2} (53.03 sq mi)

Population (2011)
  - Total: 340,983
  - Density: 2,482.8/km^{2} (6,430.3/sq mi)

Languages
  - Official: Bhojpuri, Hindi, Urdu, English
- Time zone: UTC+5:30 (IST)

Siwan community development block or simply Siwan Block (Hindi: सिवान सामुदायिक विकास खण्ड) is a Community development block in district of Siwan in Bihar state of India.

The total area of Siwan Block is 137.34 square kilometres (53.03 mi^{2}) and total population of block is 340,983 (including rural area and urban city). Siwan Nagar Parishad is the headquarter of the block.

== Panchayat and Municipality ==
Siwan block is divided into many Panchayats and a Municipality.

=== Municipal Council ===
There is one Municipal council in Siwan district, in Siwan block categorised as Nagar Parishad.

- Siwan Nagar Parishad

=== Gram Panchayats ===
There are many Gram Panchayats in Siwan block:

- Baghra
- Baletha
- Barhan
- Bhanta pokhar
- Chanaur
- Dhanauti
- Jiyaen
- Karan pura
- Mahuari
- Makariar
- Nathu chhap
- Orma makund
- Pachlakhi
- Pithauri
- Ramapali
- Sarsar
- Siari
- Tanrwa

== See also ==
- Siwan district
- Siwan Subdivision
- Siwan Nagar Parishad
