= Guthani =

Community development block in Siwan district, Bihar, India

- CD Block
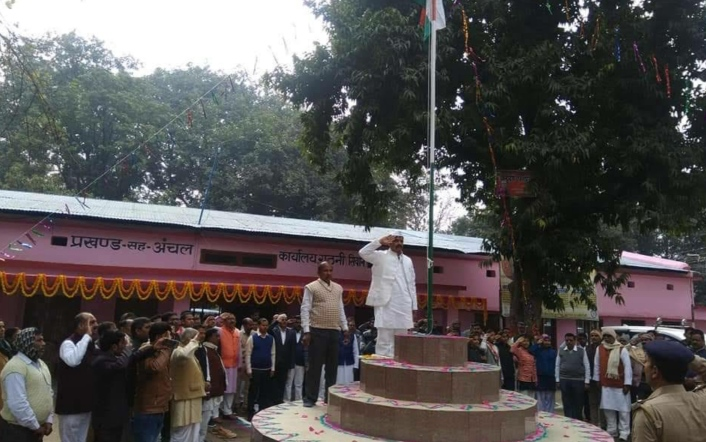
- Flag hoisting in Guthani block

- Location in Bihar, India
- Coordinates: 26.1636°N 84.0364°E
- Country: India
- State: Bihar
- District: Siwan
- Subdivision: Siwan
- Headquarters: Guthani block and circle office

Government
  - Type: Community development
  - Body: Guthani Block and Circle

Area
  - Total: 91.70 km^{2} (35.41 sq mi)
- Elevation: 73 m (240 ft)

Population (2011)
  - Total: 128,155
  - Density: 1,398/km^{2} (3,620/sq mi)

Language
  - Official: English, Hindi
  - Additional official: Urdu
  - Regional: Bhojpuri
- Time zone: UTC+5:30 (IST)
- PIN: 841435
- Telephone code: 06157
- Vehicle registration: BR-29
- Sex ratio: 1000:994 male/female
- Lok Sabha constituency: Siwan
- Vidhan Sabha constituency: Darauli

Guthani is a community development block and a revenue circle in Siwan district of the Indian state of Bihar, lying on the banks of river Chhoti Gandak. It is one of 13 blocks of Siwan Subdivision. The headquarters of the block is at Guthani town (Nagar Panchayat Guthani). The block is divided into ten gram panchayats (rural area) and one city council, Nagar Panchayat Guthani (urban area).

The total area of the block is 91.70 square kilometres (35.41 mi^{2}) and the total population of the block as of the 2011 census of India is 128,155.

== Gram panchayats ==
The following are the gram panchayats of Guthani block in Siwan subdivision, Siwan district.

- Balua
- Barpalia
- Belaur
- Biswar
- Chitakhal
- Jataur
- Parari
- Sohagara
- Sonahula
- Tarawa khurd

== See also ==
- Siwan subdivision
- Administration in Bihar
