= Siwan district =

District in Bihar, India

Coordinates: 26.2000°N 84.4000°E

- District of Bihar
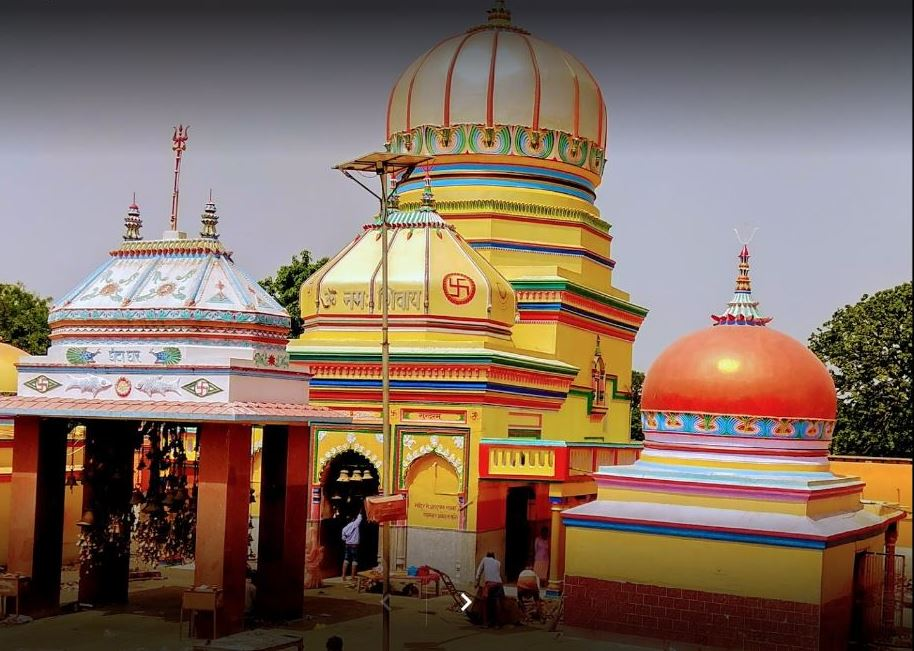
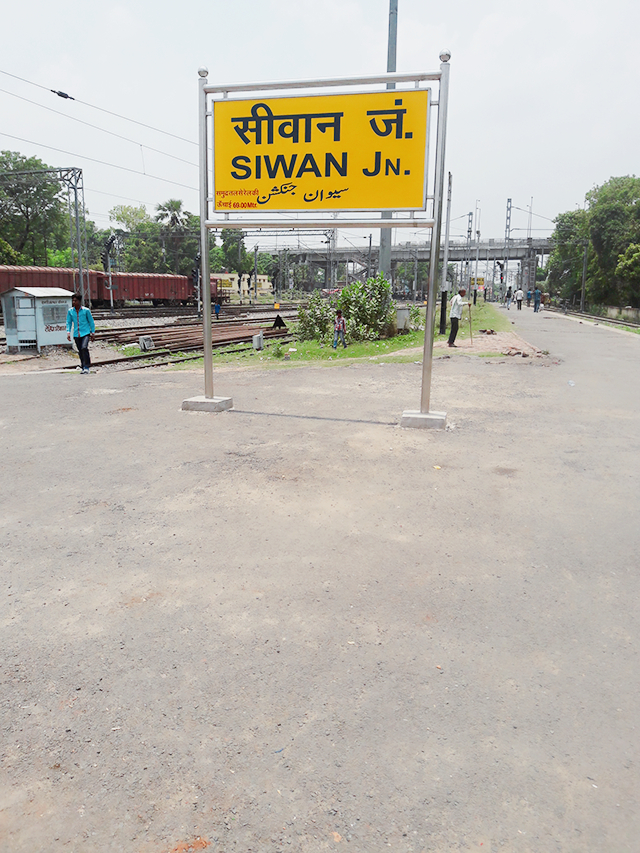
- Baba Mahendra Nath Mandir, Mehdar

- Location of Siwan district in Bihar
- Country: India
- State: Bihar
- Division: Saran
- Headquarters: Siwan, Bihar

Government
  - Collector & District Magistrate: Vivek Ranjan Maitrey, (IAS)
  - Superintendent of Police: Purav Jha, (IPS)
  - Lok Sabha constituencies: Siwan; Maharajganj
  - Vidhan Sabha constituencies: Siwan; Ziradei; Darauli; Raghunathpur; Daraunda; Barharia; Goriakothi; Maharajganj

Area
  - Total: 2,219 km^{2} (857 sq mi)
  - Rank: 24th in the state of Bihar

Population (2011)
  - Total: 3,330,465
  - Density: 1,501/km^{2} (3,890/sq mi)

Demographics
  - Literacy: 87.1% (2024)
  - Sex ratio: 988
- Time zone: UTC+05:30 (IST)
- PIN: 841xxx (Siwan)
- Major highways: NH 531
- Website: siwan.nic.in

Siwan district is one of the districts of Bihar state, India. Siwan town is the administrative headquarters of this district. Siwan district is a part of Saran division since 1972. The district was previously also known as Aliganj Siwan after the name of Raja Ali Bux Khan. Siwan has historical and mythological importance attached to it. There is ancient ashram of sage Dronacharya in the Don village. It is believed that Dronacharya had spent his time here. The Member of Parliament from Siwan is Vijaylakshmi Devi.

The district occupies an area of 2,219 square kilometres (857 sq mi).

== History ==
Siwan district, situated in the western part of the state, was originally a sub-division of Saran district, which in ancient times formed a part of Kosala Kingdom. Siwan became a fully-fledged district when it was split from Saran in 1976.

Siwan was a part of Banaras Kingdom during the 8th century. Sikandar Lodi brought this area under his kingdom in the 15th century. Babar crossed Ghaghara river near Siswan in his return journey. By the end of the 17th century, the Dutch arrived first, followed by the English. After the battle of Buxar in 1764, it became a part of Bengal. Siwan has been religious centre of various religions. According to legend, the Don village of the Darauli block in the district is believed to be location of the ancient Dronacharya Gurukul of the epic Mahabharata. During the 16th century, Dhanauti Monastery was established and Bijak was written here. It is believed that the Buddha attained nirvana in Siwan.

Siwan played an important role in 1856 independence movement. A good number of them rebelled and rendered their services to Kunwar Singh. The last ruler of Siwan was Raja Ismail Ali Khan. The anti pardah movement in Bihar was started by Sri Braj Kishore Prasad who also belonged to Siwan in response to the Non Co-Operative movement in 1920.

== Demographics ==
Historical population
| Year | Pop. | ±% p.a. |
|---|---|---|
| 1901 | 822,808 | — |
| 1911 | 781,902 | −0.51% |
| 1921 | 799,141 | +0.22% |
| 1931 | 849,186 | +0.61% |
| 1941 | 976,835 | +1.41% |
| 1951 | 1,077,453 | +0.99% |
| 1961 | 1,213,268 | +1.19% |
| 1971 | 1,462,067 | +1.88% |
| 1981 | 1,778,930 | +1.98% |
| 1991 | 2,170,971 | +2.01% |
| 2001 | 2,714,349 | +2.26% |
| 2011 | 3,330,464 | +2.07% |

Religions in Siwan district (2011)
| Religion | Percent |
| Hinduism | 81.45% |
| Islam | 18.26% |
| Other or not stated | 0.29% |

According to the 2011 census Siwan district has a population of 3,330,464. of which 1,675,090 are males while 1,655,374 are females. This gives it a ranking of 101st in India (out of a total of 640). Population within the age group of 0 to 6 years was 551,418 which is 16.55% of total population of Siwan district. Its population growth rate over the decade 2001-2011 was 22.70%. Siwan has a literacy rate of 69.45%, and sex ratio of 988 females for every 1000 males, Siwan ranks 2nd in terms of sex-ratio (988) against the state’s 918. 5.49% of the population lives in urban areas. The Scheduled Castes and Scheduled Tribes population was 386,685 (11.61%) and 87,000 (2.61%) respectively. Siwan had 534,341 households in 2011.

Languages of Siwan district (2011)
1. Bhojpuri (93.4%)
2. Urdu (4.30%)
3. Hindi (2.12%)
4. Others (0.22%)

At the time of the 2011 Census of India, 93.36% of the population in the district spoke Bhojpuri, 4.30% Urdu and 2.12% Hindi as their first language.

== Politics ==
| District | No. | Constituency | Name | Party | Alliance | Remarks |
|---|---|---|---|---|---|---|
| Siwan | 105 | Siwan | Mangal Pandey | BJP | NDA | Minister |
| Siwan | 106 | Ziradei | Bhism Pratap Singh Kushwaha | JD(U) | NDA | |
| Siwan | 107 | Darauli (SC) | Vishnu Deo Paswan | LJP(RV) | NDA | |
| Siwan | 108 | Raghunathpur | Osama Shahab | RJD | MGB | |
| Siwan | 109 | Daraunda | Karanjeet Singh | BJP | NDA | |
| Siwan | 110 | Barharia | Indradev Patel | JD(U) | NDA | |
| Siwan | 111 | Goriakothi | Devesh Kant Singh | BJP | NDA | |
| Siwan | 112 | Maharajganj | Hemnarayan Sah | JD(U) | NDA | |

== Administrative divisions ==
Siwan is divided into 2 sub-divisions, 19 Blocks, 4 municipalities and 293 Gram Panchayats (village councils).

| District | Subdivision | CD Block | Area (KM^{2}) | Population (2011) |
| 1 | 2 | 19 | 2,219 | 3,330,465 |
|---|---|---|---|---|
| Siwan | Maharajganj | Basantpur | 62.22 | 105,229 |
| Siwan | Maharajganj | Bhagwanpur Hat | 149.40 | 2,20,651 |
| Siwan | Maharajganj | Goriakothi | 138 | 223,709 |
| Siwan | Maharajganj | Lakri Nabiganj | 95.21 | 1,28,899 |
| Siwan | Maharajganj | Maharajganj | 115.48 | 1,90,217 |
| Siwan | Maharajganj | Daraundha | 126.60 | 1,73,200 |
| Siwan | Siwan Sadar | Andar | | |
| Siwan | Siwan Sadar | Barharia | 68.80 | 3,21,292 |
| Siwan | Siwan Sadar | Darauli | | |
| Siwan | Siwan Sadar | Guthani | | |
| Siwan | Siwan Sadar | HasanPura | | |
| Siwan | Siwan Sadar | Hussainganj | | |
| Siwan | Siwan Sadar | Mairwa | | |
| Siwan | Siwan Sadar | Nautan | | |
| Siwan | Siwan Sadar | Pachrukhi | | |
| Siwan | Siwan Sadar | Raghunathpur | | |
| Siwan | Siwan Sadar | Siswan | | |
| Siwan | Siwan Sadar | Siwan Sadar | | |
| Siwan | Siwan Sadar | Ziradei | | |

== Notable people ==
- Rajendra Prasad, 1st President of India
- Abdul Ghafoor
- Apoorvanand
- Avishek Sinha
- Azazul Haque
- Baccha Prasad Singh
- Bishwanath Singh
- Brajkishore Prasad
- Chandrashekhar Prasad
- Indradeep Sinha
- Jai Prakash Narayan Singh
- Janardan Tiwari
- Kaushalendra Pratap Shahi
- Kavita Singh
- Khesari Lal Yadav
- Mangal Pandey
- Manoj Bhawuk
- Meeran Haider
- Mihir Diwakar
- Mohammad Shahabuddin
- Natwarlal
- Nirupama Pandey
- Noori Mian
- Om Prakash Yadav
- Prabhavati Devi
- Rajan Ji Maharaj spiritual speaker and devotional singer
- Ramdev Singh
- Ramesh Singh Kushwaha
- Raza Naqvi Wahi
- Satyendra Dubey
- Shyam Bahadur Singh
- Sunil Prasad
- Syed Ali Akhtar Rizvi
- Vashishtha Narayan Singh
