= List of Monuments of National Importance in Bihar =

This is a list of Monuments of National Importance (ASI) as officially recognized by and available through the website of the Archaeological Survey of India in the Indian state Bihar. The monument identifier is a combination of the abbreviation of the subdivision of the list (state, ASI circle) and the numbering as published on the website of the ASI. 70 Monuments of National Importance have been recognized by the ASI in Bihar.

== List of monuments of national importance ==
SL. No.	Description	Location	Address	District	Coordinates	Image
N-BR-1	Tomb of Shamsher Khan	Shamshernagar		Aurangabad	25°05′26″N 84°27′34″E	Tomb of Shamsher Khan More images
N-BR-2	Vikramashila monastic university	Antichak		Bhagalpur	25°19′26″N 87°17′05″E	Vikramashila monastic university More images
N-BR-3	Rock Temple	Kahalgaon		Bhagalpur	25°15′47″N 87°13′17″E	Rock Temple More images
N-BR-4	Patalpuri cave and land adjoining Bateshwar Sthan cave on the Patharghata hill	Madhorampur		Bhagalpur	25°19′44″N 87°15′38″E	Patalpuri cave and land adjoining Bateshwar Sthan cave on the Patharghata hill More images
N-BR-5	Rock sculptures	Patharghatta Hill, Madhorampur		Bhagalpur	25°19′41″N 87°15′38″E	Rock sculptures More images
N-BR-6	Ancient mound	Buxar		Buxar		Upload Photo
N-BR-7	Ashoka column known as Laur pillar	Lauriya Araraj		East Champaran	26°33′01″N 84°38′51″E	Ashoka column known as Laur pillar More images
N-BR-8	Fort ruins, tank and Stupa	Sagardih		East Champaran	26°27′32″N 84°57′35″E	Fort ruins, tank and Stupa More images
N-BR-9	Kesaria Stupa	Tajpur Deur		East Champaran	26°20′03″N 84°51′18″E	Kesaria Stupa More images
N-BR-10	Sujata Stupa	Bakraur		Gaya	24°41′53″N 85°00′12″E	Sujata Stupa More images
N-BR-11	Ancient mounds in the valley known as “Hasra Kol”	Bishunpurtarwa, Hasra and Jagdishpur		Gaya		Upload Photo
N-BR-12	Ancient mouds in the hill known as ‘Sobhnath’	Bishunpurtarwa, Hasra and Jagdishpur		Gaya		Upload Photo
N-BR-13	Ancient Buddhist and other sculptures collected in a temple	Guneri		Gaya	24°37′06″N 84°44′09″E	Upload Photo
N-BR-14	Koncheswar Mahadev Shiva temple	Konch		Gaya	24°56′01″N 84°46′18″E	Koncheswar Mahadev Shiva temple More images
N-BR-15	Sculptures of various Hindu deities carved on the southern and eastern faces of some rocks and boulders of Kauwadol Hill	Kurisarai		Gaya	24°59′30″N 85°01′40″E	Sculptures of various Hindu deities carved on the southern and eastern faces of some rocks and boulders of Kauwadol Hill More images
N-BR-16	Sculptures of various Hindu deities carved on the face of an isolated round boulder separated by a distance of 12 feet from the south-eastern corner of the Kauwadol Hill.	Kurisarai		Gaya	24°59′31″N 85°01′43″E	Sculptures of various Hindu deities carved on the face of an isolated round boulder separated by a distance of 12 feet from the south-eastern corner of the Kauwadol Hill. More images
N-BR-17	Sculptures of various Hindu deities carved on the northern-eastern faces of some rocks of Kauwadol Hill.	Kurisarai		Gaya	24°59′32″N 85°01′43″E	Sculptures of various Hindu deities carved on the northern-eastern faces of some rocks of Kauwadol Hill. More images
N-BR-18	Sculptures of four Hindu deities one on each side of an oblong isolated boulder to the east of the Kauwadol Hill.	Kurisarai		Gaya	24°59′33″N 85°01′44″E	Sculptures of four Hindu deities one on each side of an oblong isolated boulder to the east of the Kauwadol Hill. More images
N-BR-19	The whole of the ancient ruins on which there are a colossal statue of Buddha, a few loose sculptures and thirteen sandstone pillars.	Kurisarai		Gaya	24°59′37″N 85°01′40″E	The whole of the ancient ruins on which there are a colossal statue of Buddha, a few loose sculptures and thirteen sandstone pillars. More images
N-BR-20	The area generally known as ‘Garh’ is the site of an ancient Buddhist monasteryand chaityas, a Shiva temple and a tank.	Kurkihar		Gaya	24°49′43″N 85°15′13″E	The area generally known as ‘Garh’ is the site of an ancient Buddhist monasteryand chaityas, a Shiva temple and a tank. More images
N-BR-21	Gopika Cave	Nagarjuni hills		Jehanabad	25°00′33″N 85°04′42″E	Gopika Cave More images
N-BR-22	Karan Chaupar Cave	Barabar hills		Jehanabad	25°00′21″N 85°03′47″E	Karan Chaupar Cave More images
N-BR-23	Vadathika cave	Nagarjuni hills		Jehanabad	25°00′41″N 85°04′37″E	Vadathika cave More images
N-BR-24	Lomas Rishi cave	Barabar hills		Jehanabad	25°00′20″N 85°03′47″E	Lomas Rishi cave More images
N-BR-25	Sudama Cave	Barabar hills		Jehanabad	25°00′20″N 85°03′47″E	Sudama Cave More images
N-BR-26	Vapiyaka Cave	Nagarjuni hills		Jehanabad	25°00′40″N 85°04′37″E	Vapiyaka Cave More images
N-BR-27	Visva Jhopa Cave	Barabar hills		Jehanabad	25°00′20″N 85°03′56″E	Visva Jhopa Cave More images
N-BR-28	Ancient Buddhistic image and sculptures collected underneath a shed	Ghejan		Jehanabad	25°03′58″N 84°53′23″E	Upload Photo
N-BR-29	Ancient monolithic pillar known as Lat	Lat		Jehanabad	25°05′54″N 85°09′37″E	Ancient monolithic pillar known as Lat More images
N-BR-30	Tomb of Bakhtiar Khan	Malik Sarai		Kaimur	25°01′51″N 83°29′18″E	Tomb of Bakhtiar Khan More images
N-BR-31	Temple of Mundeswari Devi	Paura		Kaimur	24°59′01″N 83°33′53″E	Temple of Mundeswari Devi More images
N-BR-32	Kanhaiya ji ka mandir	Bandarjhula		Kishanganj	26°22′06″N 87°57′49″E	Upload Photo
N-BR-33	Remains of ancient fort or Pachrukhi Garh locally known as Raja Bali Ka Garh	Balirajgarh		Madhubani	26°27′38″N 86°19′08″E	Upload Photo
N-BR-34	Ashokan Column	Kolhua		Vaishali	26°00′50″N 85°06′32″E	Ashokan Column More images
N-BR-35	Ancient mound	Bargaon		Nalanda	25°08′38″N 85°26′35″E	Upload Photo
N-BR-36	Tomb of Malik Ibrahim Bayu	Bihar Sharif		Nalanda	25°12′19″N 85°30′15″E	Tomb of Malik Ibrahim Bayu More images
N-BR-37	Ancient remains known as Garh	Ghorakatora		Nalanda	25°01′18″N 85°31′20″E	Ancient remains known as Garh More images
N-BR-38	Statue of Buddha (Rukmini Sthan Nalanda)	Jagdishpur		Nalanda	25°07′24″N 85°25′45″E	Upload Photo
N-BR-39	All mounds, structures and buildings enclosed in the acquired area	Nalanda		Nalanda	25°08′14″N 85°26′35″E	All mounds, structures and buildings enclosed in the acquired area More images
N-BR-40	All ancient structures and other monuments	Rajgir		Nalanda	25°01′14″N 85°24′53″E	All ancient structures and other monuments More images
N-BR-41	All ancient structures and all artificial ancient remains which are situated within a distance of half a mile of the said two ancient cities known as old and new Rajgriha	Rajgir		Nalanda	25°01′02″N 85°25′10″E	All ancient structures and all artificial ancient remains which are situated within a distance of half a mile of the said two ancient cities known as old and new Rajgriha More images
N-BR-42	Walls of the two ancient cities known as old and new Rajgriha	Rajgir		Nalanda	24°58′47″N 85°25′43″E	Walls of the two ancient cities known as old and new Rajgriha More images
N-BR-43	The grove known as “Bulandibagh”	Bulandipur		Patna	25°36′10″N 85°10′48″E	The grove known as “Bulandibagh” More images
N-BR-44	The mound or stupa known as “Chhoti Paharai”	Chhoti Pahari		Patna		Upload Photo
N-BR-45	Sculpture and Images	Datiana		Patna	25°29′01″N 84°51′44″E	Upload Photo
N-BR-46	Supposed site of the Palace of Ashoka	Kumrahar		Patna	25°35′59″N 85°11′03″E	Supposed site of the Palace of Ashoka More images
N-BR-47	Tomb of Shah Makhadum Daulat Maneri and Ibrahim Khan	Maner		Patna	25°38′29″N 84°52′26″E	Tomb of Shah Makhadum Daulat Maneri and Ibrahim Khan More images
N-BR-48	Tank	Maner		Patna	25°38′26″N 84°52′24″E	Tank More images
N-BR-49	Ancient Mound and ruined brick walls together with adjacent land which is part of survey plot No. 608 & 611	Maner		Patna		Ancient Mound and ruined brick walls together with adjacent land which is part of survey plot No. 608 & 611
N-BR-50	Ancient Mound and ruined brick walls together with adjacent land constituting survey plot No. 399	Maner		Patna		Ancient Mound and ruined brick walls together with adjacent land constituting survey plot No. 399
N-BR-51	Mounds known as the five stupasor "Panch Pahari"	Paharidih		Patna		Upload Photo
N-BR-52	(i) Ablution Tank, (ii) Mir Ashraf’s Jama Mosque and (iii) Pucca well	Patna		Patna	25°35′30″N 85°13′41″E	(i) Ablution Tank, (ii) Mir Ashraf’s Jama Mosque and (iii) Pucca well More images
N-BR-53	Remains of wooden foundations and ancient Mauryan walls	Sandalpur		Patna	25°36′19″N 85°10′46″E	Remains of wooden foundations and ancient Mauryan walls More images
N-BR-54	Ashokan inscription on the Chandan Shahid hill	Ashikpur		Rohtas	24°56′31″N 84°02′16″E	Ashokan inscription on the Chandan Shahid hill More images
N-BR-55	Rohtasgarh fort	Rohtasgarh		Rohtas	24°37′24″N 83°55′06″E	Rohtasgarh fort More images
N-BR-56	Tomb of Hasan Khan Suri	Sasaram		Rohtas	24°56′55″N 84°00′52″E	Tomb of Hasan Khan Suri More images
N-BR-57	Tomb of Sher Shah Suri	Sasaram		Rohtas	24°56′53″N 84°00′33″E	Tomb of Sher Shah Suri More images
N-BR-58	Three rock inscriptions (Adjacent to Tara Chandi temple)	Sasaram		Rohtas	24°55′17″N 84°02′52″E	Upload Photo
N-BR-59	Remains of Ancient city	Manjhi		Saran		Upload Photo
N-BR-60	Ancestral House of Dr. Rajendra Prasad, the First President of India	Jiradei		Siwan	26°11′35″N 84°15′16″E	Upload Photo
N-BR-61	Jami mosque	Hajipur		Vaishali	25°41′15″N 85°11′52″E	Jami mosque More images
N-BR-62	Relic Stupa of Vaishali	Harpur Basant Vaishali		Vaishali	25°59′45″N 85°07′04″E	Relic Stupa of Vaishali More images
N-BR-63	Raja Vishal ka Garh	Vaishali		Vaishali	25°59′13″N 85°07′39″E	Raja Vishal ka Garh More images
N-BR-64	Ruined fortress, Chankigarh	Chanki		West Champaran	27°08′17″N 84°25′22″E	Ruined fortress, Chankigarh More images
N-BR-65	Ashoka column	Lauriya Nandangarh		West Champaran	26°59′55″N 84°24′31″E	Ashoka column More images
N-BR-66	Vedic burial mounds	Lauriya Nandangarh		West Champaran	26°59′50″N 84°24′27″E	Upload Photo
N-BR-67	Ruined fortress at Nandangarh and the rampart of the fort	Marhia		West Champaran	26°59′11″N 84°23′39″E	Ruined fortress at Nandangarh and the rampart of the fort More images
N-BR-68	Vedic burial mounds	Marhia		West Champaran	26°58′49″N 84°23′48″E	Upload Photo
N-BR-69	Vedic burial mounds	Pakri		West Champaran	26°59′55″N 84°24′00″E	Upload Photo
N-BR-70	Ashoka column	Rampurwa		West Champaran	27°16′11″N 84°29′57″E	Ashoka column More images

== See also ==
- List of Monuments of National Importance in India for other Monuments of National Importance in India
- List of State Protected Monuments in Bihar
