= List of State Protected Monuments in Bihar =

This is a list of State Protected Monuments as officially reported by, and available through, the website of the Archaeological Survey of India in the Indian state Bihar. The monument identifier is a combination of the abbreviation of the subdivision of the list (state, ASI circle) and the numbering as published on the website of the ASI. 30 State Protected Monuments have been recognized by the ASI in Bihar. Besides the State Protected Monuments, also the Monuments of National Importance in this state might be relevant.

== List of state protected monuments ==
SL. No.	Description	Location	Address	District	Coordinates	Image
S-BR-1	Ara House, Maharaja College Compound	Arah				Upload Photo
S-BR-2	Fort of Daud Khan, Daudnagar, Aurangabad	Aurangabad				Upload Photo
S-BR-3	Archaeological Site, Kheri, Shahkund	Bhagalpur				Upload Photo
S-BR-4	Tomb of Mahmudshah, Kahalgaon	Bhagalpur				Upload Photo
S-BR-5	Babu Veer Kumar Singh, Birth place, Jagdishpur	Bhojpur				Upload Photo
S-BR-6	Bausagarh (Nasratpur)	Buxar				Upload Photo
S-BR-7	Ramshila Hill, Gaya	Gaya				Upload Photo
S-BR-8	Pretshila Hill (Bagdi Chiraiya Road, Bahadur Bigha)	Gaya				Upload Photo
S-BR-9	Vishnupad Temple, Gaya	Gaya				Vishnupad Temple, Gaya More images
S-BR-10	Brahmayoni Hill, Gaya	Gaya				Brahmayoni Hill, Gaya More images
S-BR-11	Taradih (Mastipur) Bodh Gaya	Gaya				Upload Photo
S-BR-12	Jama Masjid, Hajipur	Hajipur				Jama Masjid, Hajipur
S-BR-13	Gira Bigaha	Jahanabad				Upload Photo
S-BR-14	masahi Kaimur	Kaimur	masahi R.S no-422	kaimur		Upload Photo
S-BR-15	Katragarh	Muzaffarpur				Upload Photo
S-BR-16	Fort of Munger	Munger				Upload Photo
S-BR-17	Golghar	Patna				Golghar More images
S-BR-18	Agamkuan Gulzarbagh, Patna City	Patna				Agamkuan Gulzarbagh, Patna City
S-BR-19	Beguhjam Masjid, Patna City	Patna				Upload Photo
S-BR-20	Jain Temple, Kamaldah, Gulzarbagh	Patna				Jain Temple, Kamaldah, Gulzarbagh
S-BR-21	Do Ruikhi Pratima, Kumrahar	Patna				Upload Photo
S-BR-22	Choti Patandevi, Patna city	Patna				Choti Patandevi, Patna city
S-BR-23	Jalagarh Fort Karba	Purnia				Upload Photo
S-BR-24	Sun Temple, Mauza Kandaha, Mahyasa Mahishi	Saharsa				Upload Photo
S-BR-25	Chirand	Saran				Upload Photo
S-BR-26	Shergarh Fort (Sabzibagh, Sasaram)	Sasaram/Rohtas				Upload Photo
S-BR-27	Tomb of Alabal Khan, Sasaram	Sasaram/Rohtas				Tomb of Alabal Khan, Sasaram
S-BR-28	Nepali Temple, Hajipur	Hajipur				Nepali Temple, Hajipur
S-BR-29	Nishan Singh Martyr Memorial & Cemetery	West Champaran				Upload Photo
S-BR-30	Hazarimal Dharmashala, Bettiah	West Champaran				Upload Photo

== See also ==
- List of Monuments of National Importance in Bihar
- List of Monuments of National Importance in Jharkhand
- List of State Protected Monuments in Jharkhand
- List of State Protected Monuments in India
