= Ancestral House of Rajendra Prasad =

Historic house museum in Siwan, Bihar, India

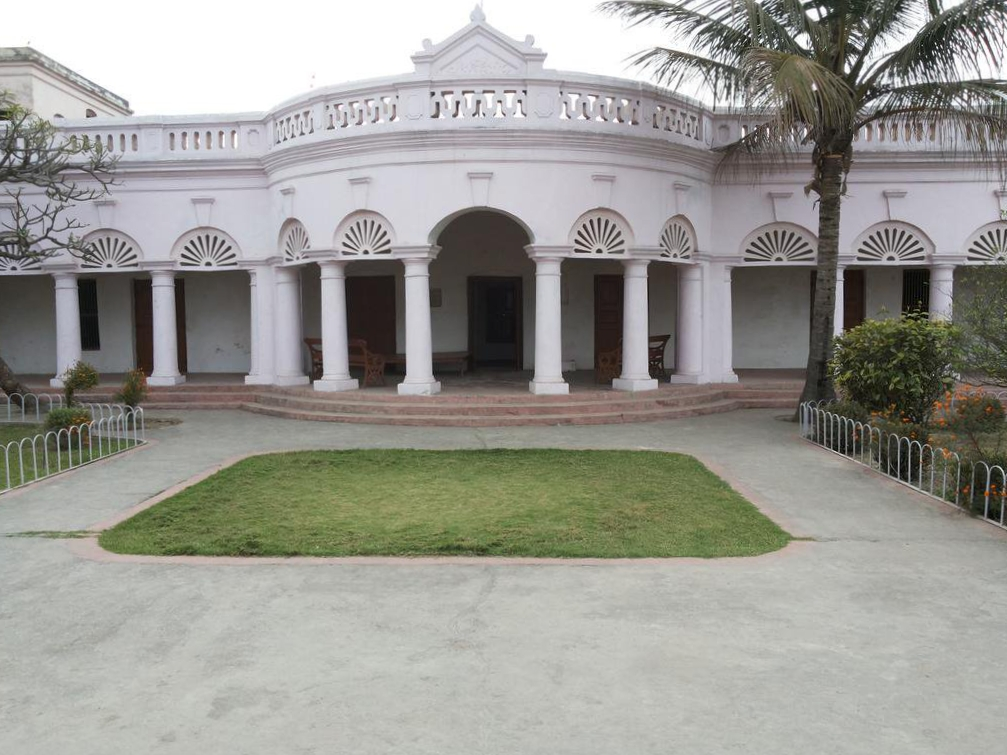
- Front of the House
- Location: Ziradei, Siwan, Bihar, India
- Coordinates: 25.459376°N 81.8599815°E
- Type: Historic house museum
- Maintain & Protected by: Archaeological Survey of India

Monument of National Importance
- Official name: Ancestral House of Dr. Rajendra Prasad the First President of India
- Designated: 26 July 2001; 24 years ago
- Reference no.: N-BR-65
- Callection circle: Patna

The Ancestral House of Rajendra Prasad also known as Dr. Rajendra Prasad's Ancestral House, is located in Ziradei block of Siwan district, state of Bihar, India. This house holds immense historical and national importance, representing a significant landmark in the life of a key figure in India's independence movement. The house is now a protected monument, maintained by the Archaeological Survey of India's Patna circle since July 26, 2001 with serial number N-BR-65 in the list of Monuments of National Importance for Bihar state.

== History ==
This is the ancestral home of Dr. Rajendra Prasad, who was first President of India. Prasad ji was born in this house in the year 1884.

== Gallery ==
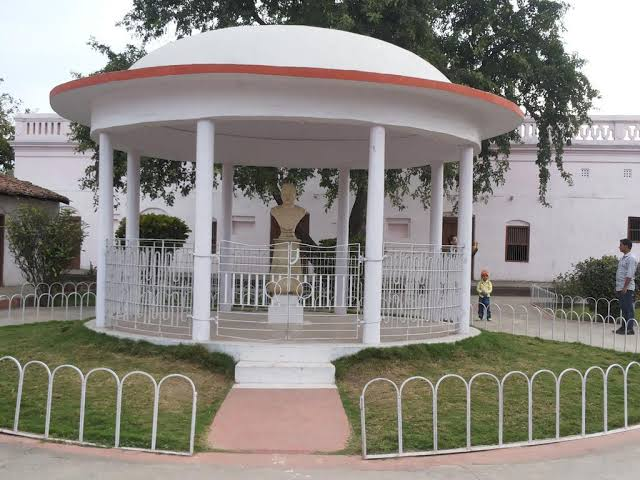

== See also ==
- Sadaqat Ashram
- List of Monuments of National Importance in Bihar
- List of museums in India
- Archeological Survey of India
