= Outline of Jharkhand =

State in eastern India

Location of Jharkhand

The following outline is provided as an overview of and topical guide to Jharkhand:

Jharkhand – state in eastern India carved out of the southern part of Bihar on 15 November 2000. The state shares its border with the states of Bihar to the north, Uttar Pradesh and Chhattisgarh to the west, Odisha to the south, and West Bengal to the east. It has an area of 79,710 km2 (30,778 sq mi). The city of Ranchi is its capital while the industrial city of Jamshedpur is the most popular city because of jamshed tata of the state.

== General reference ==
=== Names ===
- Common English name: Jharkhand
  - Pronunciation:
- Official English name(s): Jharkhand
- Nickname(s):
- Adjectival(s): Jharkhandi
- Demonym(s): Jharkhandis

=== Rankings (amongst India's states) ===
- by population: 14th
- by area (2011 census): 16th
- by crime rate (2015): 23rd
- by gross domestic product (GDP) (2024): 19th
- by Human Development Index (HDI):
- by life expectancy at birth:
- by literacy rate:

== Geography of Jharkhand ==
Geography of Jharkhand

- Jharkhand is: an Indian state
- Population of Jharkhand: 32,988,134 (2011)
- Area of Jharkhand: 79,714 km^{2} (30,778 sq mi)
- Atlas of Jharkhand

=== Location of Jharkhand ===
- Jharkhand is situated within the following regions:
  - Northern Hemisphere
  - Eastern Hemisphere
    - Eurasia
      - Asia
        - South Asia
          - Indian subcontinent
            - India
              - East India
- Time zone: Indian Standard Time (UTC+05:30)

it consist of a forest cover of almost 30% of its total geographical area.

Betla national park palamu is its lone national park and palamu tiger reserve its lone tiger reserve.

=== Regions of Jharkhand ===
==== Administrative divisions of Jharkhand ====
Five administrative division of Jharkhand states-Palamu, North Chhotanagpur, South Chhotanagpur, Kolhan, Santhal Pargana.

===== Districts of Jharkhand =====
24 district in jharkhand.

- Districts of Jharkhand

===== Municipalities of Jharkhand =====
- Cities of Jharkhand
  - Capital of Jharkhand: Ranchi

According to the census 2011 Jharkhand has a total population of 3.2 crore. Hindu consist of 68% of the total population. Islam is then followed by 14% of the population. Sarnaism and Christianity is followed by 13% and 4% respectively.

== Government and politics of Jharkhand ==
Politics of Jharkhand

- Form of government: Indian state government (parliamentary system of representative democracy)
- Capital of Jharkhand: Ranchi
- Jharkhand State Capitol: Jharkhand Legislative Assembly
- Political parties in Jharkhand
- Elections in Jharkhand

=== Union government in Jharkhand ===
- Rajya Sabha members from Jharkhand
- Jharkhand Pradesh Congress Committee
- Indian general election, 2009 (Jharkhand)
- Jharkhand Legislative Assembly

=== Branches of the government of Jharkhand ===
Government of Jharkhand

==== Executive branch of the government of Jharkhand ====
- Head of state: Governor of Jharkhand,
- Head of government: Chief Minister of Jharkhand,

==== Legislative branch of the government of Jharkhand ====
Jharkhand Legislative Assembly

==== Judicial branch of the government of Jharkhand ====
Jharkhand High Court

=== Law and order in Jharkhand ===
Cannabis in Jharkhand

Capital punishment in Jharkhand

Constitution of India

Crimes in Jharkhand

Prisons in Jharkhand

- Law enforcement
  - Jharkhand Police

== History of Jharkhand ==
History of Jharkhand

== Culture of Jharkhand ==
Culture of Jharkhand

- Architecture of Jharkhand
- Cuisine of Jharkhand
- Monuments in Jharkhand
  - Monuments of National Importance in Jharkhand
  - State Protected Monuments in Jharkhand
- World Heritage Sites in Jharkhand

=== Art in Jharkhand ===
- Music of Jharkhand

=== People of Jharkhand ===
- People from Jharkhand

=== Religion in Jharkhand ===
Religion in Jharkhand

- Christianity in Jharkhand

=== Sports in Jharkhand ===
Sports in Jharkhand

- Cricket in Jharkhand
  - Jharkhand Cricket Association
  - Jharkhand cricket team
- Football in Jharkhand
  - Jharkhand football team

=== Symbols of Jharkhand ===
Symbols of Jharkhand

- State animal: elephant
- State bird: koel
- State flower: palash
- State seal: ashok chakra with four daggers
- State tree: saal/ sakhua

== Economy and infrastructure of Jharkhand ==
Economy of Jharkhand

- Tourism in Jharkhand

== Education in Jharkhand ==
Education in Jharkhand

- Institutions of higher education in Jharkhand

== Health in Jharkhand ==
Health in Jharkhand

== See also ==
- Outline of India
