= 1950 Indian presidential election =

- 24 January 1950
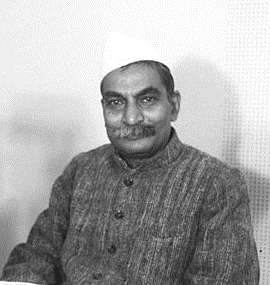
Nominee	Rajendra Prasad
Party	INC
Home state	Bihar
Electoral vote	Unopposed
Governor-General before election
Chakravarti Rajagopalachari
INC
President
Rajendra Prasad
INC

Elections for the post of the first president of India were to be held on 24 January 1950. There was only one nominee for the post, Rajendra Prasad and he was elected, unopposed, as the President.

== Details ==
The Constituent Assembly of India met for the last time on 24 January 1950, two days before the Constitution came into effect on the 26th. On that day, they declared that the song Jana Gana Mana was the national anthem of India, signed a Hindi copy of the constitution and voted in a new President. Prasad had been the president of the Constituent Assembly from December 1946. He was proposed to be the first Indian president by Jawaharlal Nehru and was seconded by Vallabhbhai Patel. There were no other nominations and hence the secretary of the assembly, H. V. R. Iengar declared that Rajendra Prasad was considered to be duly elected to the office of President of India.

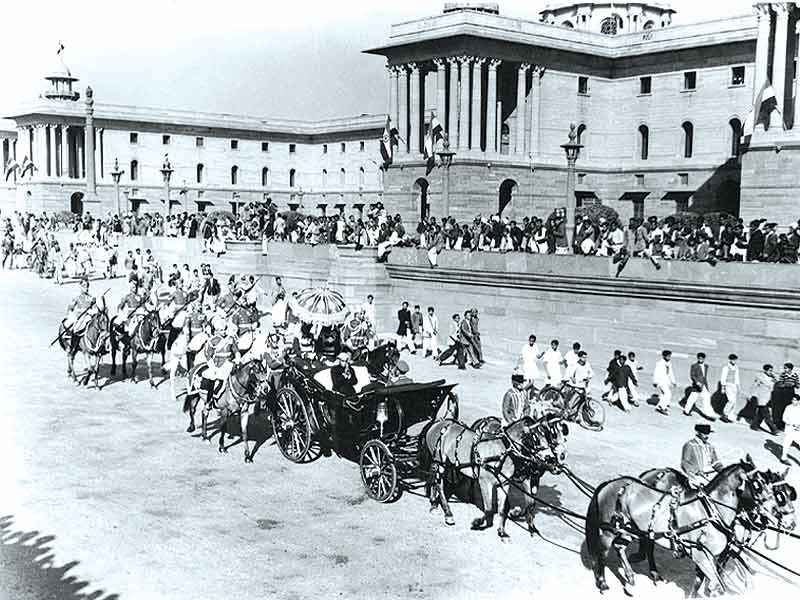
President Rajendra Prasad (in the horse-drawn carriage) readies to take part in the first Republic Day parade on Rajpath, New Delhi, in 1950

He was sworn in on the first Republic Day, 26 January 1950, by the outgoing Governor-General of India, C. Rajagopalachari, in the presence of the Chief Justice of India, Sir Harilal Jekisundas Kania. Prasad's sister, Bhagwati Devi, had died the previous day, 25 January. He attended her cremation after the founding and swearing-in ceremony.

== See also ==
- 1952 Indian presidential election
