= Rajendra Smriti Sangrahalaya =

Biographical museum in Patna, India

- राजेंद्र स्मृति संग्रहालय, पटना
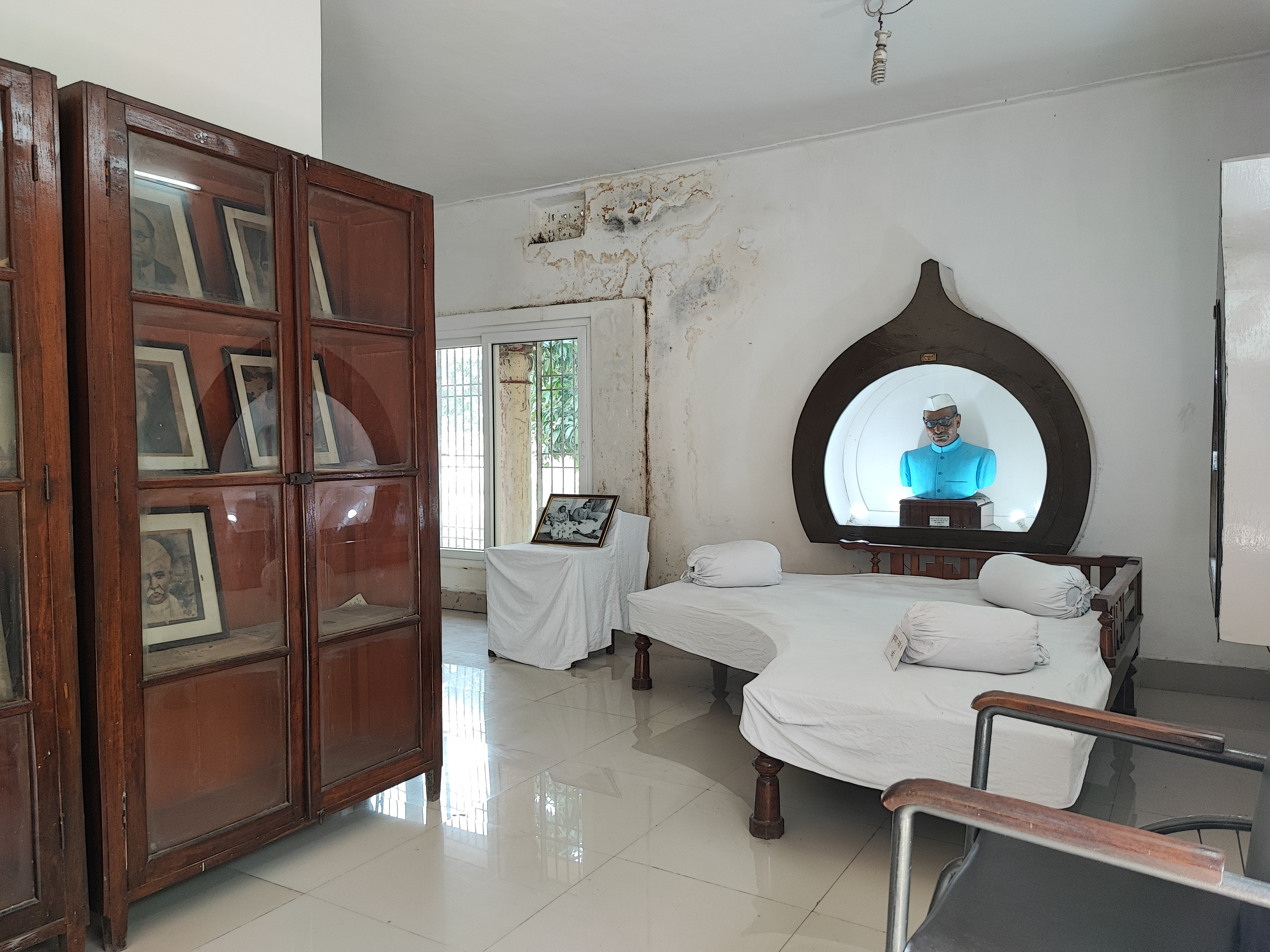
- Inside Rajendra Smriti Sangrahalaya

- Location within Patna
- Established: 1963
- Location: Sadaqat Ashram, Patna, Bihar, India
- Coordinates: 25.6325°N 85.115278°E
- Website: rss.bih.nic.in

Rajendra Smriti Sangrahalaya (Rajendra Memorial Museum) is a small biographical museum and a heritage building located in city of Patna, Bihar, India. It is dedicated to the life and works of Dr. Rajendra Prasad, the first president of India.
