= Chankigarh =

Archeological site in Bihar

- चानकीगढ़ (Maithili)
- Janakigarh
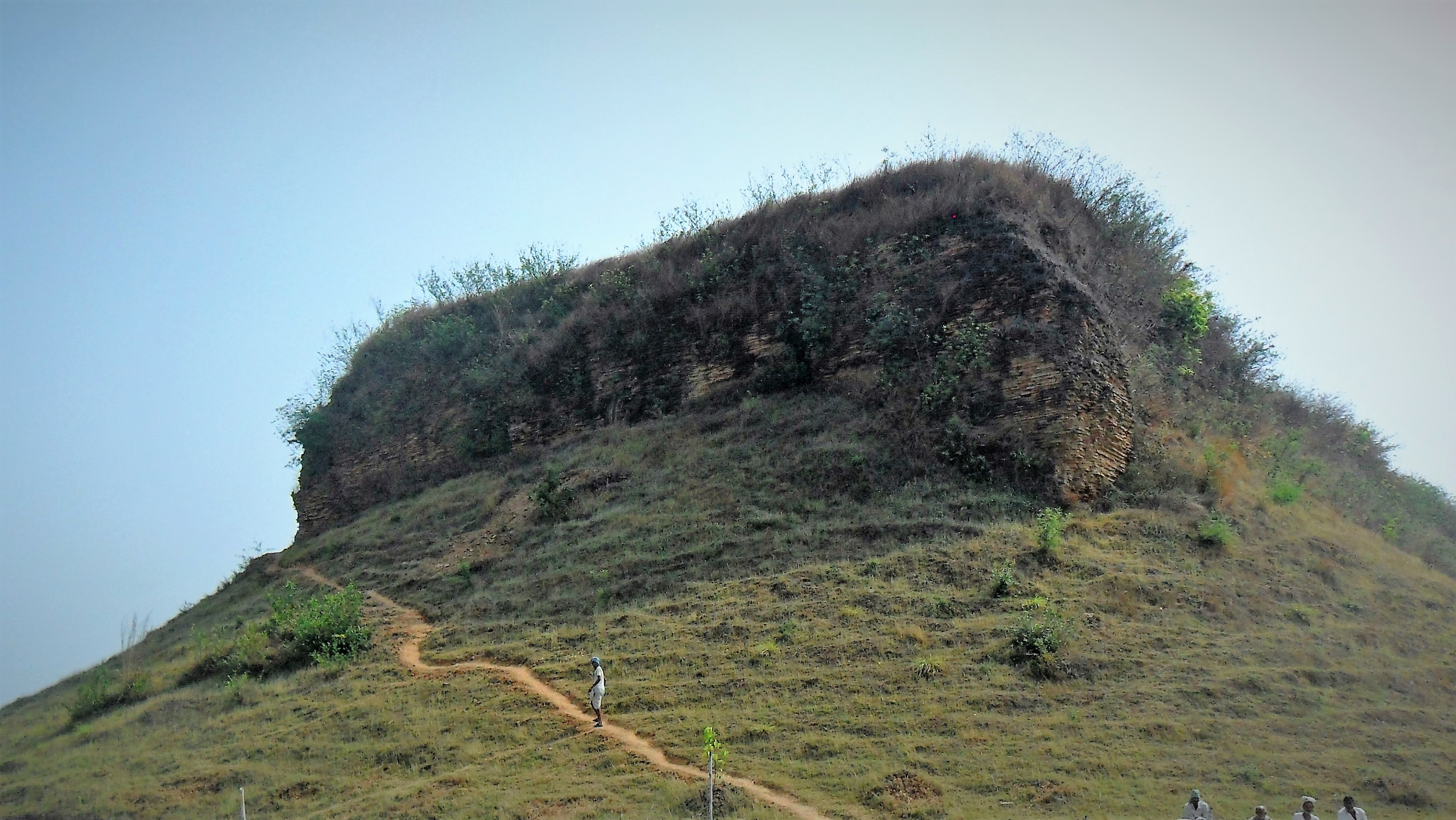
- View of the mound at Chankigarh
- Interactive map of Chankigarh
- 27.1382139°N 84.4228506°E
- Location: Chanki village, Narkatiaganj block, West Champaran
- Region: Mithila

Site notes
- Condition: Ruins

Chankigarh (Maithili: चानकीगढ़) also locally known as Janakigarh is an archeological site in the Mithila region of Bihar in India. It is located at Chanki village of the Narkatiaganj block in the West Champaran district of Bihar. There is a high mound with ruins of a fortress at the site. According to the local legends, the ruins of fortress is believed to be either of King Janaka in Mithila or of the prominent Indian strategist Acharya Chanakya. It is also known as Janki Kot.
