= Ziradei =

Community development block in Siwan district, Bihar, India

Ziradei Jiradei
- Community development block
- Location in Bihar, India
- Coordinates: 26°14′10″N 84°14′53″E
- Country: India
- State: Bihar
- District: Siwan

Population (2001)
  - Total: 138,078

Languages
  - Official: Bhojpuri, Hindi
- Time zone: UTC+5:30 (IST)
- Lok Sabha constituency: Siwan
- Vidhan Sabha constituency: Ziradei
- Website: siwan.bih.nic.in

Ziradei (also spelt Jiradei) is one of the administrative divisions of Siwan district in the Indian state of Bihar.

== Geography ==
Ziradei is located at 26°14′10″N 84°14′53″E

== History and people ==
Rajendra Prasad, the first President of India was from Ziradei, and the Ancestral House of Rajendra Prasad can still be visited there.

=== Panchayats ===
Panchayats in Ziradei community development block are: Akolhi, Mairwa, Don Bazar, Gangpaliya, Badhenya, Bharauli, Chandauli Gangauli, Chandpali, Chhotaka Manjha, Garar, Hasua, Jamapur, Manjhawalia, Miya Ke Bhatkan, Narindrapur, Sakara, Thepaha, Titara and Ziradei.

== Demographics ==
As per 2001 census, Ziradei block had a population of 138,078.

== Personalities ==
- Rajendra Prasad, the first President of India, was born at Ziradei on 3 December 1884.
- Mithilesh Kumar Srivastava, better known as Natwarlal, was a noted Indian con man known for having repeatedly "sold" the Taj Mahal, the Red Fort, and the Rashtrapati Bhavan and also the Parliament House of India along with its 545 sitting members. He was also born in Bangra a small village in Ziradei constituency Siwan, by profession he was a lawyer before he turned into a conman.

== See also ==
- Ziradei (Vidhan Sabha constituency)
- 2015 Bihar Legislative Assembly election
