= Sadaqat Ashram =

Ashram in Patna

Sadaqat Ashram is located in Patna, Bihar, beside the main road of Digha area, on the banks of the River Ganges, almost seven kilometres from the airport. This was one of the residences of Dr. Rajendra Prasad, the first President of India, who lived there after retirement and spent the last days of his life there.

It was established by Maulana Mazharul Haque in 1921. Spread over 20 acres, ashram's land was donated by his close associate Maulana Mazharul Haque's friend Khairun miyan to the national movement. During the independence movement important meetings between eminent freedom fighters like Brajkishore Prasad, Maulana Mazharul Haque, Dr. Anugrah Narayan Sinha, and Rajendra Prasad took place here. After Independence, Jayaprakash Narayan launched his historic movement during the 1970s from the Sadaqat Ashram.

== Present day ==
Today, it is the headquarters of Bihar Vidyapeeth, a National University and Bihar Pradesh Congress Committee. The ashram now has a museum, the Rajendra Smriti Sangrahalaya, that displays Rajendra Prasad's personal belongings and many historical things belonging to the freedom struggle of India. It attracts many tourists every year.

== See also ==
- Ancestral House of Rajendra Prasad
- Sabarmati Ashram
