= Tomb of Bakhtiyar Khan =

Tomb of Bakhtiar Khan
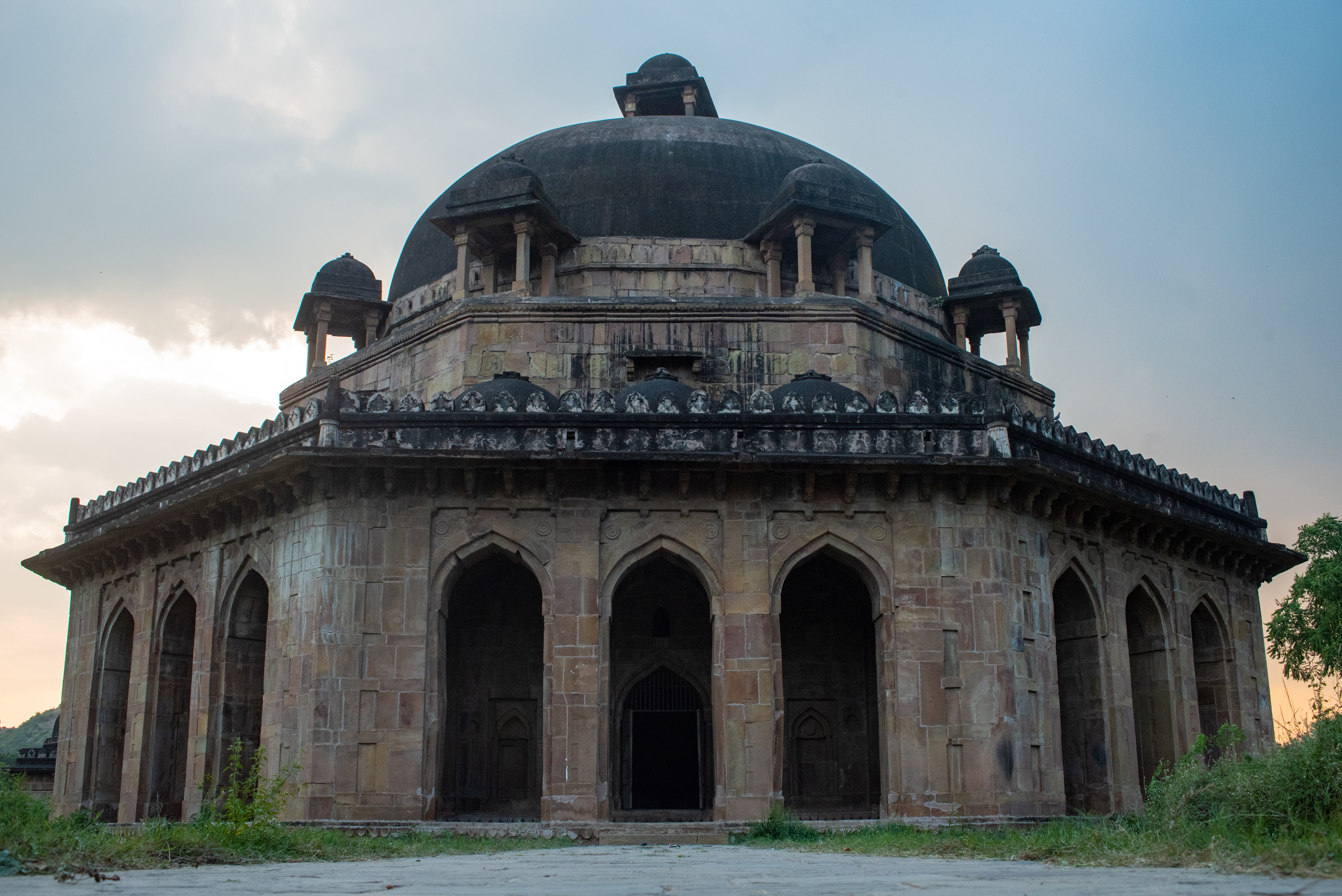
- Interactive map of Tomb of Bakhtiar Khan
- 25°1′51″N 83°29′18″E
- Location: Chainpur, Kaimur district, Bihar, India

Site notes
- Architectural style: Indo-Islamic architecture

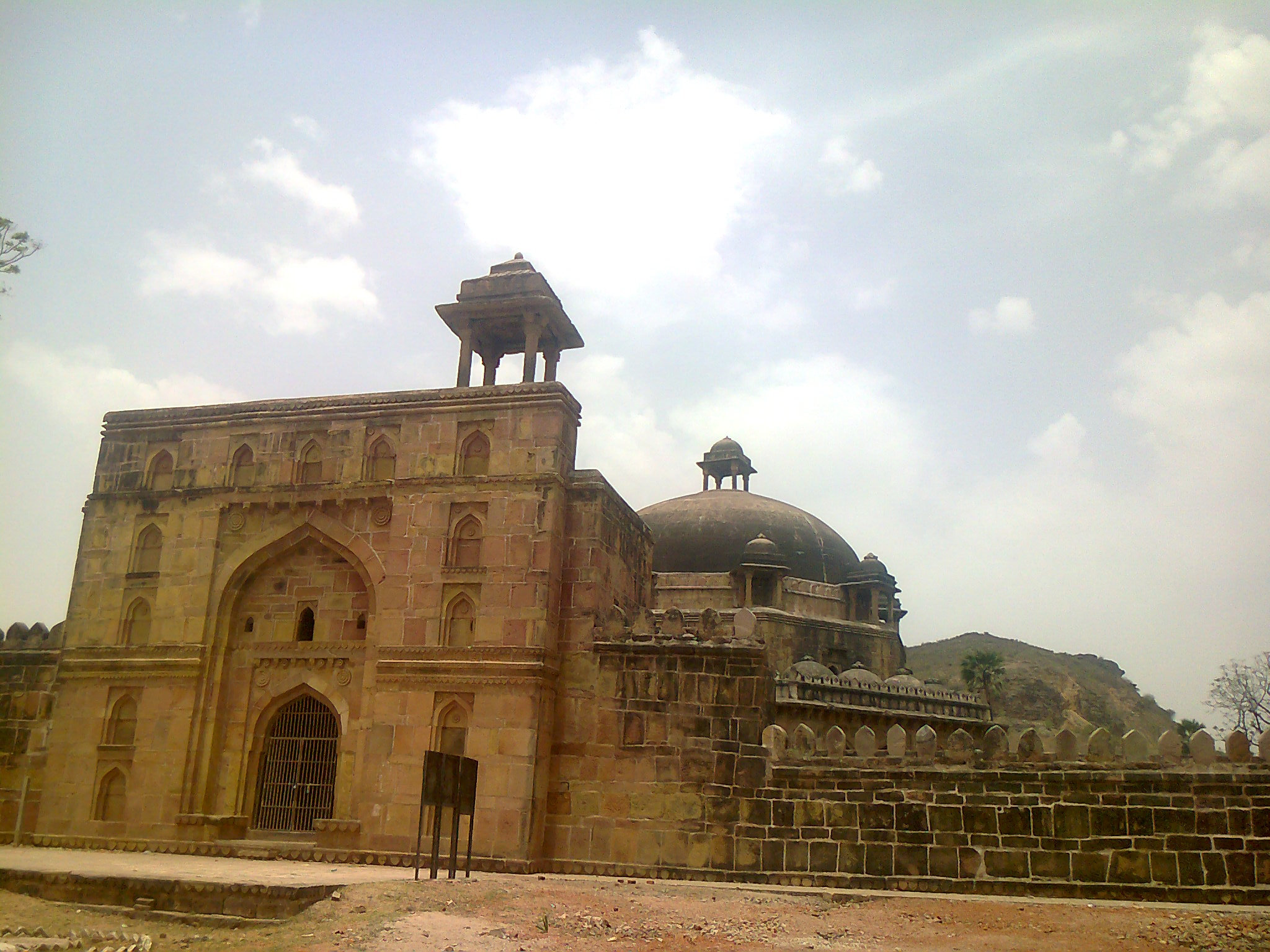
The gateway which is located on the Eastern side of the tomb. The tomb is seen in the background

The Tomb of Bakhtiyar Khan is a tomb located in the Kaimur district of the Indian state of Bihar. It is a monument of national importance.

== History ==
The tomb inscription does not contain a date of construction. From the style of construction, it can be inferred that it was built during the same period as the Tomb of Sher Shah Suri. It is generally accepted that it was constructed between the 16th and 17th centuries.

== Architecture ==
It is an example of Indo-Islamic architecture. The tomb is an octagonal building, situated on a low plinth. The gateway is on the Eastern side of the tomb.

The tomb inscription contains verses from the Quran. There are about thirty graves within the tomb. In addition, there are some graves in the outer courtyard.

== Location ==
It is located on the outskirts of Chainpur, a few kilometres west of the district headquarters Bhabua.

== See also ==
- List of monuments of national importance in Bihar
