= Pretshila =

Sacred Hindu site in Gayaji

Pretshila Vedi
- प्रेतशिला वेदी

Religion
- Affiliation: Hinduism
- District: Gayaji
- Region: Magadh
- Deity: Lord Vishnu; Lord Yama

Location
- Location: Pretshila Hill
- State: Bihar
- Country: India
- Interactive map of Pretshila Vedi
- Coordinates: 24.8452154°N 84.9683848°E

Pretshila (Devanagari: प्रेतशिला) is a sacred hill in the Gayaji district of Bihar in India. It is a revered place for Hindu adherents coming to perform pind daan for their ancestors. It is a legendary site having religious significance associated with Puranas. On top of the legendary hill, there is a temple dedicated to Lord Yama in Hinduism. In the tradition of Hinduism, Lord Yama is believed to be the God of Death. There is a sacred altar called Pretshila Vedi, which holds footprints of Lord Vishnu as per Hindu legends. Similarly, a sacred water body known as Brahma Kund is also situated at the Pretshila Hill.
