= Tomb of Shamsher Khan (Shamshernagar) =

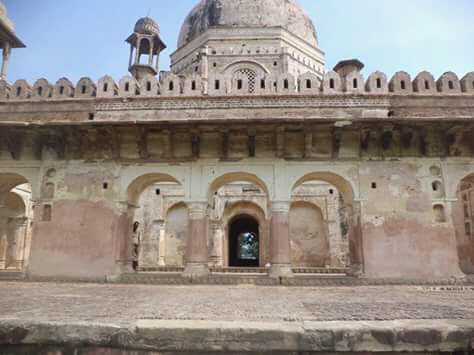
- Interactive map of Tomb of Shamsher Khan
- 25°05′26″N 84°27′34″E
- Location: Shamshernagar, Bihar

Site notes
- Architectural style: Mughal

Monument of National Importance
- Official name: Tomb of Shamsher Khan
- Reference no.: N-BR-7

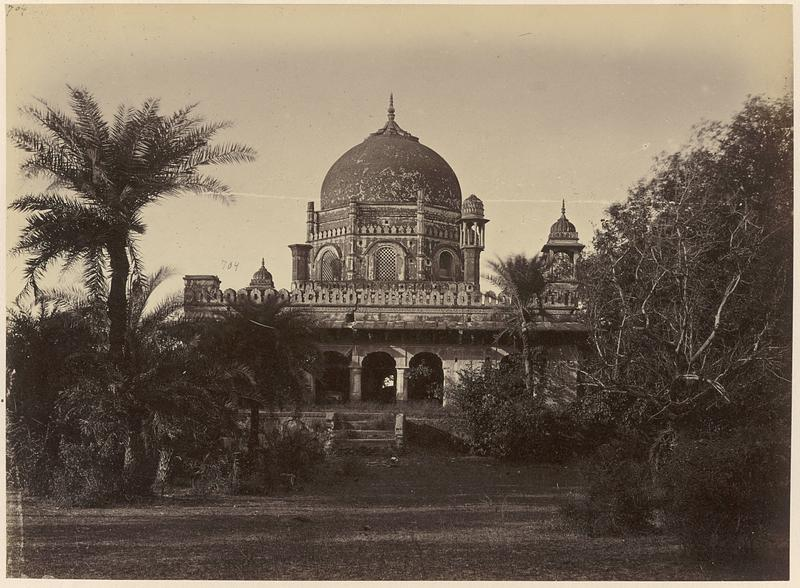
Shamsher Khan's Tomb, Shamshernagar (circa 1870)

Tomb of Shamsher Khan is a tomb in Shamshernagar in the Indian state of Bihar. It is listed as a monument of national importance.

== Background ==
Shamsher Khan was the Mughal governor of Bihar Subah. He built the tomb for himself, as well as a caravanserai, before his death in 1712.

== Description ==
The tomb has a square plan. The building is crowned with a dome, resting upon a tall drum. The drum contains latticed screens.
