= Chanki, Bihar =

Village in Bihar, India

Chanki
- Village
- Location within Bihar
- Coordinates: 27.108°N 84.464°E
- Country: India
- State: Bihar
- District: West Champaran district

Government
  - Type: Panchayati raj (India)
  - Body: Gram panchayat

Languages
  - Official: Hindi
- Time zone: UTC+5:30 (IST)
- ISO 3166 code: IN-BR

Chanki is a village in West Champaran district in the Indian state of Bihar.

== Demographics ==
As of the 2011 census of India, Chanki had a population of 2413 in 488 households. Males constitute 52.63% of the population and females 47.36%. Chanki has an average literacy rate of 55.9%, lower than the national average of 74%: male literacy is 62.26%, and female literacy is 37.73%. In Chanki, 20.47% of the population is under 6 years of age.
