= Colgong Rock Temple =

The Rock temples in Colgong (or Kahalgaon) located at Kahalgaon are located in Bhagalpur, 80 km away from Sultanganj. The temple dates back to the Gupta period and has carvings showing multiple religions like Hindu, Jainism and Buddhism. The temple is dedicated to Lord Shiva. The monument is centrally funded by Archaeological Survey of India.
