= Kurkihar hoard =

Set of bronzes found in Bihar, India

Coordinates: 24.813915°N 85.203245°E

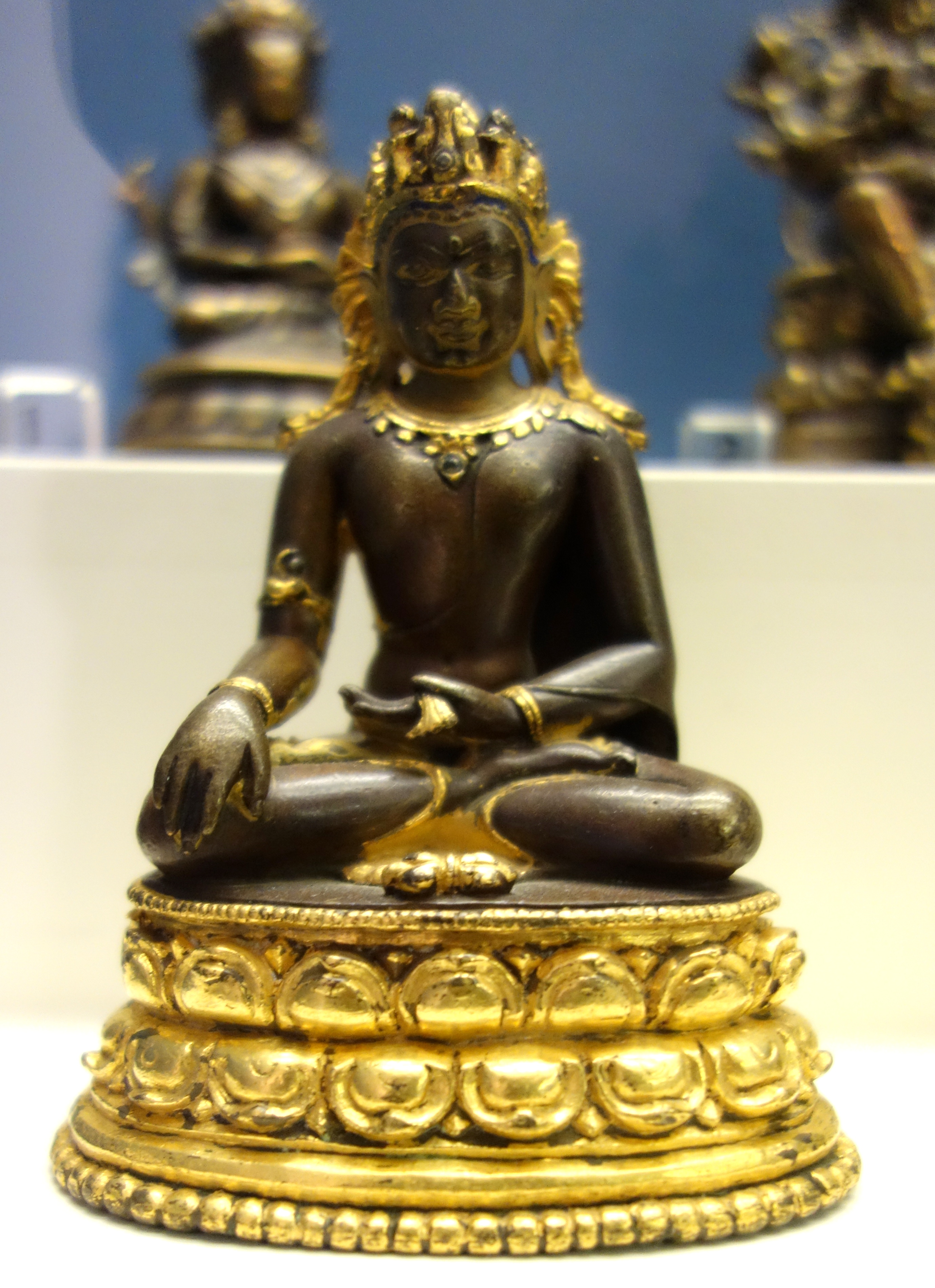
Seated Buddha Akshobya, Kurkihar, 11th century AD, Pala Period, gilt copper alloy with silver and gold inlay - Fitchburg Art Museum - DSC08841

The Kurkihar hoard is a set of 226 bronzes, mostly Buddhist, dating to between the 9th and 12th centuries CE, which were found in Kurkihar near Gaya in the Indian state of Bihar. The village of Kurkihar is situated about 5 km. north-east of Wazirganj, and 27 km east from Gaya. The inscriptions found suggest that Kurkihar was once a well known international pilgrimage center.

These include a gilded Avalokiteshvara image from 12th century, referred to as being resplendent.

The monastery where the bronzes were found was named Apanakain in an Ashtasahasrika Prajnaparamita manuscript now in LACM.

== Discovery ==
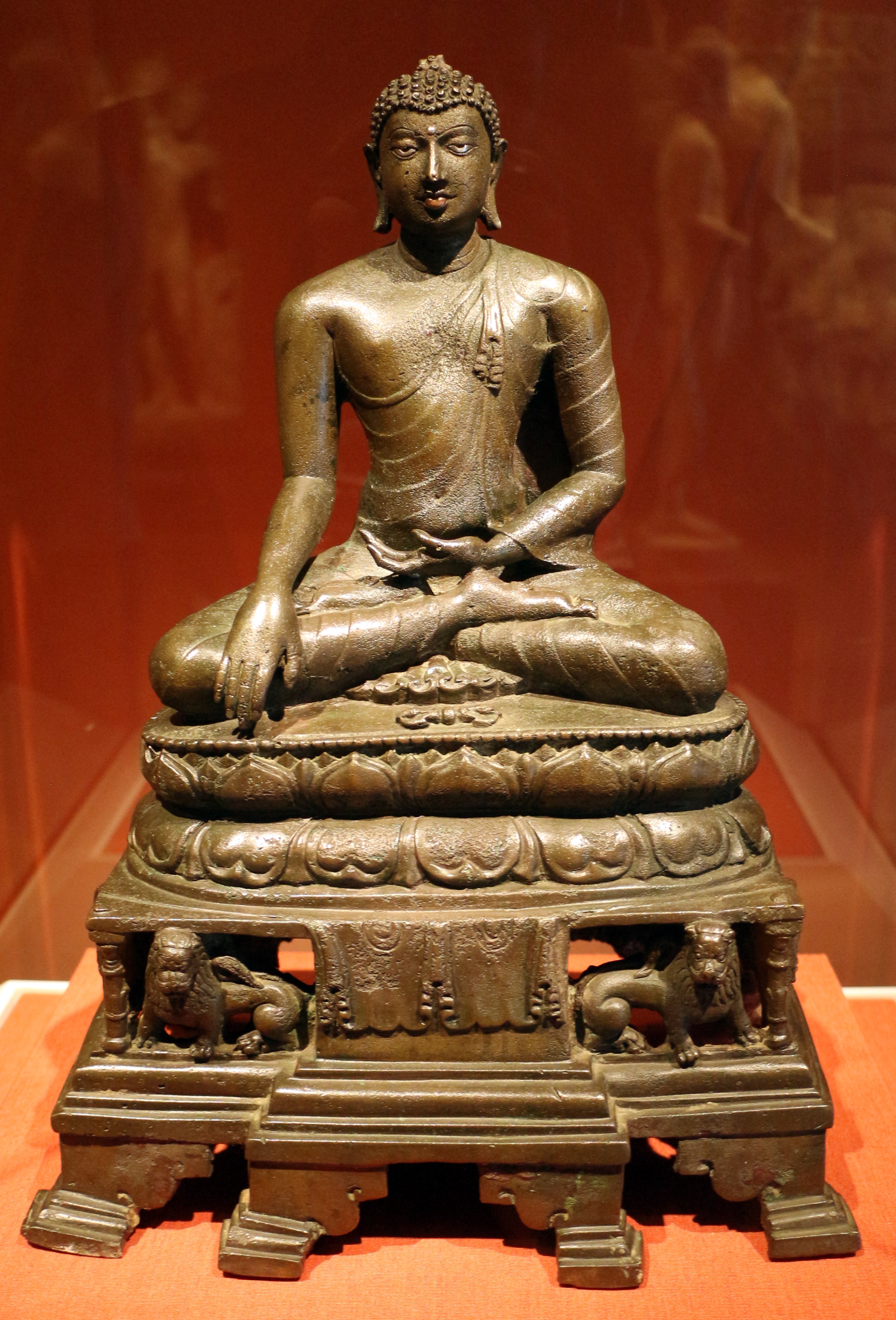
Bihar, Akshobhya, Kurkihar, 890 CE, Cleveland Museum of Art

Major Markham Kittoe visited Kurkihar twice in 1847 and on the second visit to the village, spent four days collecting "ten cart-loads of images; all Buddhist and the Tamrika period". A great portion of this collection is preserved in the Indian Museum, Kolkata. Some of Kittoe's collection can also be found in the British Museum, London. Cunningham visited Kurkihar in 1861-62 and again in 1879-80. He mentions that the site was about 600 feet square and about 25 feet high. He mentioned having seen here not only numerous Buddhist images, large and small, but a large number of votive stupas. He says there were in his time "row after row of Chaityas extending north to south for several hundred feet".

In 1930 a hoard of 226 bronzes and five other objects was found at Kurkihar, which were unearthed from the main mound. These included Buddhas, Bodhisattvas, Stupas, Bells and ritual objects. Today, these objects are displayed in special room in the Patna Museum.

Of the 87 images, 81 were Buddhist and 6 Hindu. They were all found in one spot, with the smaller images enclosed in earthen jars. They were found about 25 feet below the surface of the main mound, when someone was digging for bricks.

A number of stone images have also been found from the Pala period, some of which are still in active worship at the local Devi temple.

== Major images ==
In 2005, for an exhibition in Australia, two of the three statues representing India were from Kurkihar, they were valued at US $30 million.

== Inscriptions ==
Cunningham has written: "I procured several short but interesting inscriptions at Kurkihar. The name of Sakala is mentioned in several of them, and also Kerala in Dakshinades. The age of these inscriptions, judging from the shapes of the letters, must be about A.D. 800 to 1000"

Ninety three inscriptions have been found on the bronzes. The Kurkihar inscriptions refer to Devapala (810–c. 850), Rajyapala (908–940), Mahipala (988–c. 1036) and Vigrahapala III (1054–1072), ranging from 9th century to 1074 AD. The name of the monastery was apparently named Apanaka, which is mentioned in several inscriptions. The monastery was apparently very popular among the visitors from Kanchi in South India.

The names, places of origin and ranks of the donors for 9-12th century have been analyzed. The distribution is 9th century:14, 10th: 21, 11th: 25, and 12th: 10.

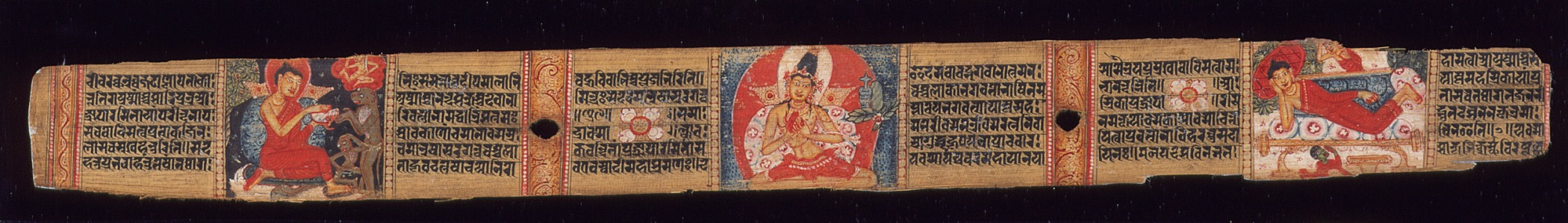
Maitreya and Scenes from the Buddha's Life, LACMA

== Manuscript ==
A circa 1100–1125 manuscript of Ashtasahasrika Prajnaparamita now in LACM. was copied in this monastery during the rule of Ramapala.

== Significance ==
Kurkihar was apparently a major pilgrimage center located midway between Gaya and Rajgriha and as well an artistic center of brass and stone sculpting. The inscriptions found refer to donors not only from distant place in India like Sakala in Punjab, and Kerala, Conjeevaram or Kanchi in the south, but also from Bali Islands, Malaya as well as other countries. The inscriptions refer to a number of kings, mostly of the Pala dynasty.

== Comparison with Nalanda bronzes ==
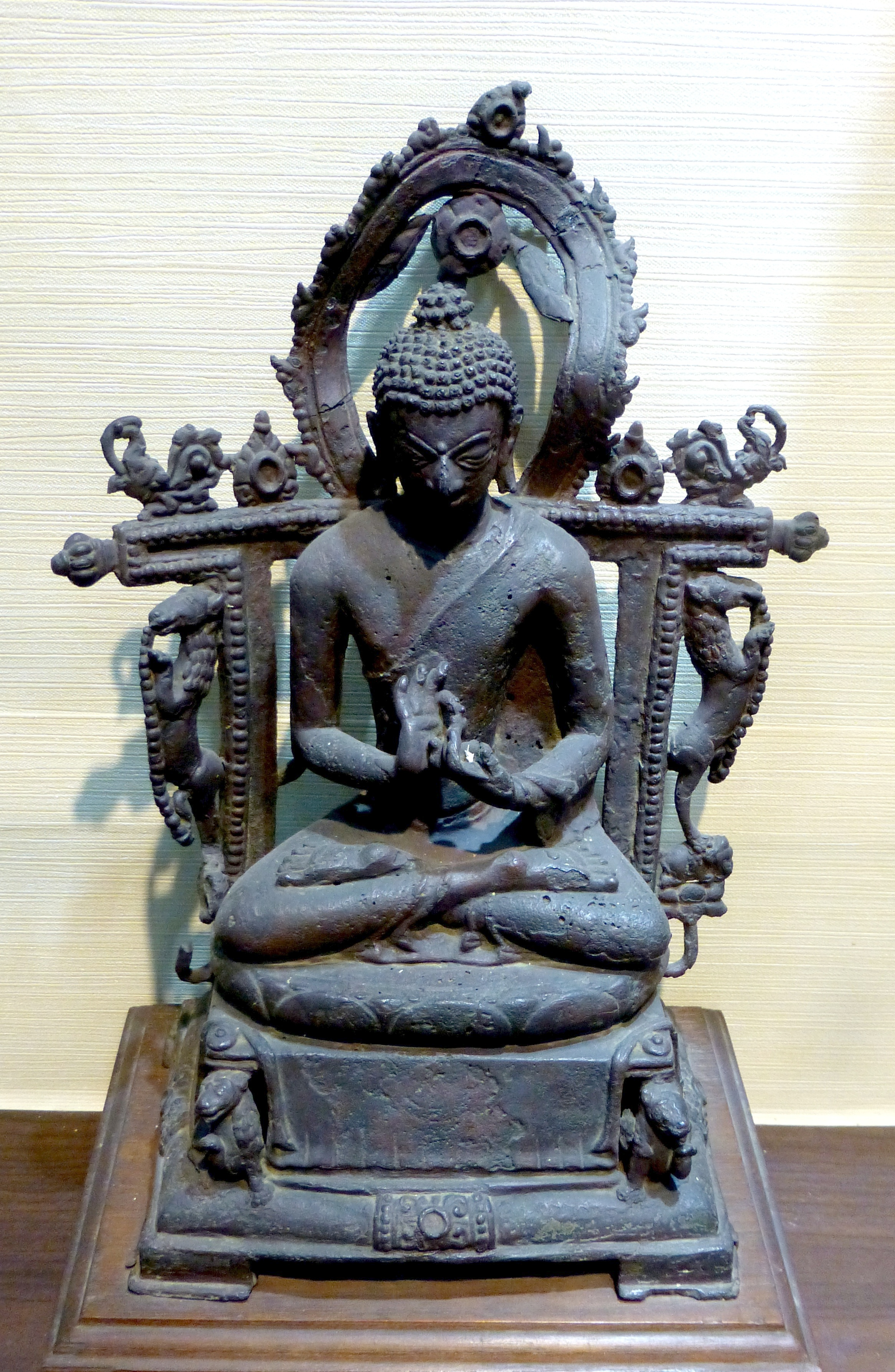
Buddha Teaching, Nalanda

Kurkihar bronzes have been compared with the bronzes from nearby Nalanda. It has been suggested that Nalanda sculptors may have settled in Kurkihar Kurkihar bronzes data from 10th to 12th cent while Nalanda bronzes cover the period from 7th to 9th cent. nalanda bronzes are reddish whereas Kurkihar bronzes are more yellow.

== Museums ==
Most of the Kurkihar bronzes are in the Patna Museum. The Hindu temple situated in the north-eastern portion of the village was visited by Cunningham in 1861 where a number of images, both Buddhist and Hindu images, dated to the 10th–11th Century AD, have been preserved here.

== Patna Museum theft ==
On Sept 26, 2006, 18 bronze images from Kurkihar were stolen from the Patna Museum. The thieves entered through a window by cutting the cutting bars. The images were later recovered from a gang including a Vinod Yadav in Nalanda district, and Shahid Warsi of Kolkata. A Manjushri image was not recovered.

== Recovery of Bodhisatva Padmapani image in Italy ==
In 2022, an image of Bodhisatva Padmapani, stolen from the Kundalpur Devisthan Temple at Kurkiar was surrendered by the owner and is in the process of being returned to India.

== Buddhist images in worship at the Modern Hindu Temple ==
In the modern Devistahan Kundalpur Hindu temple at there are a number of Buddhist images still in active worship.

== Gallery ==
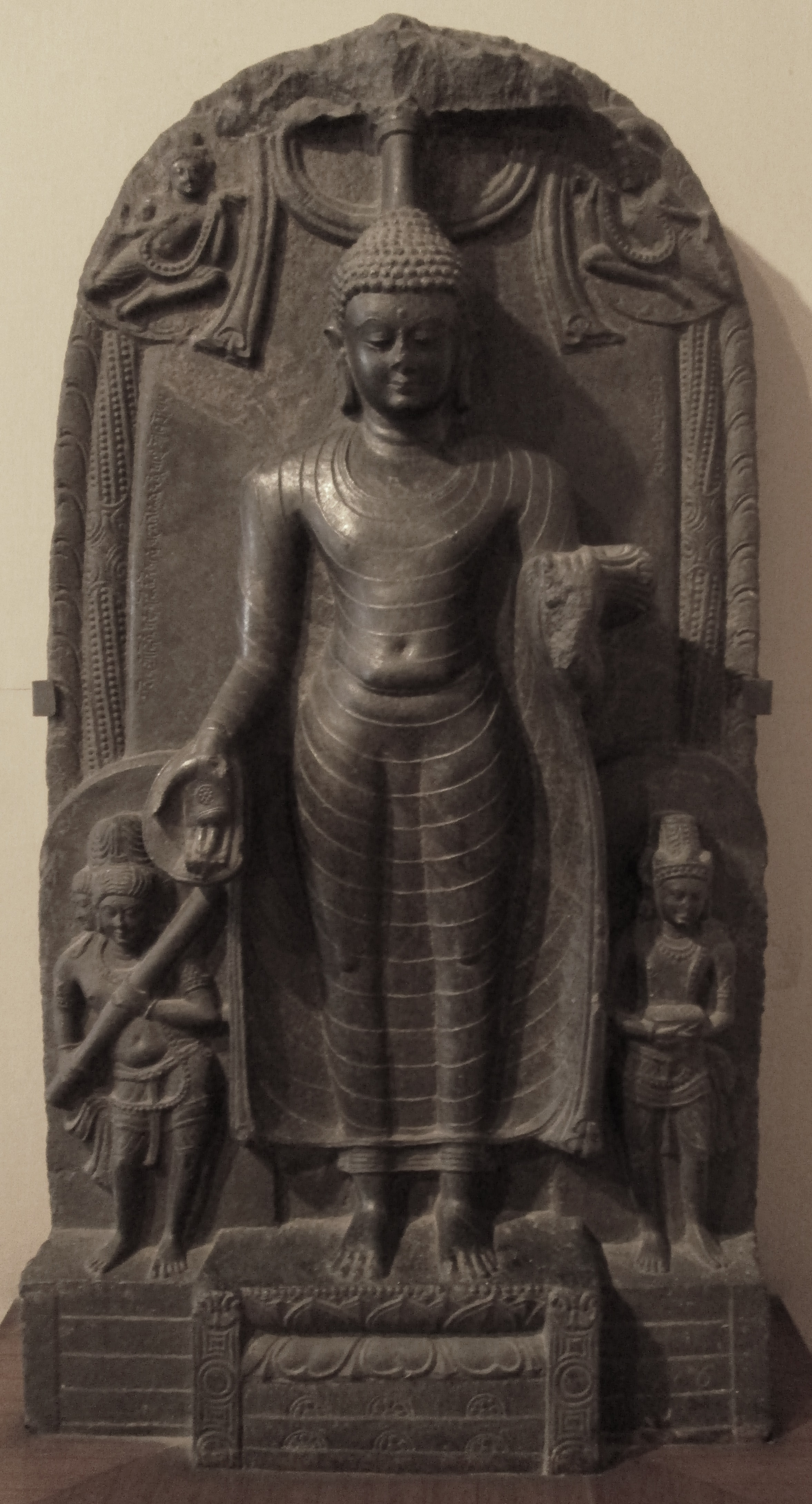
Indian Museum Sculpture - Buddha Descending from Heaven

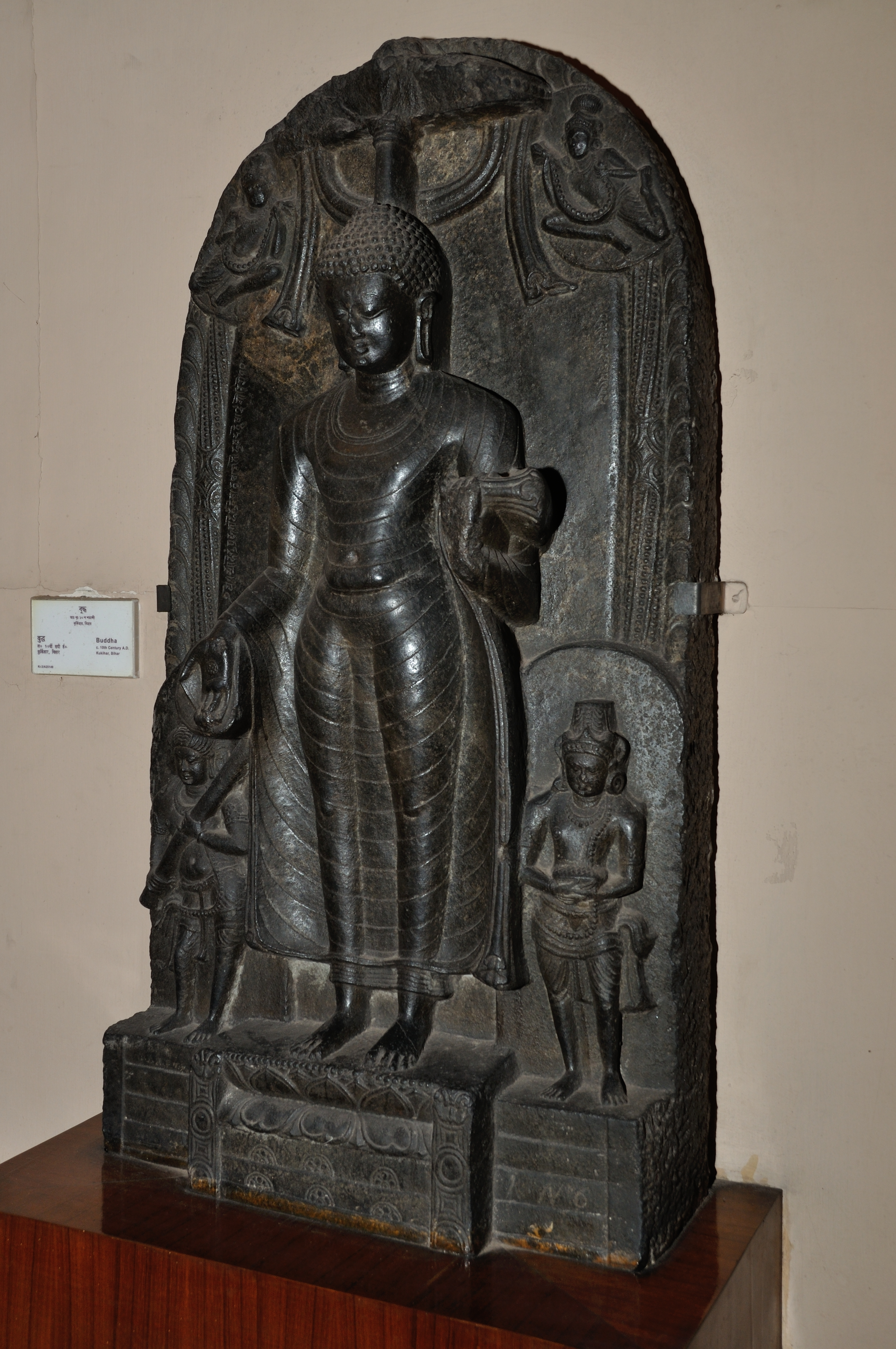
Buddha - Circa 10th Century CE

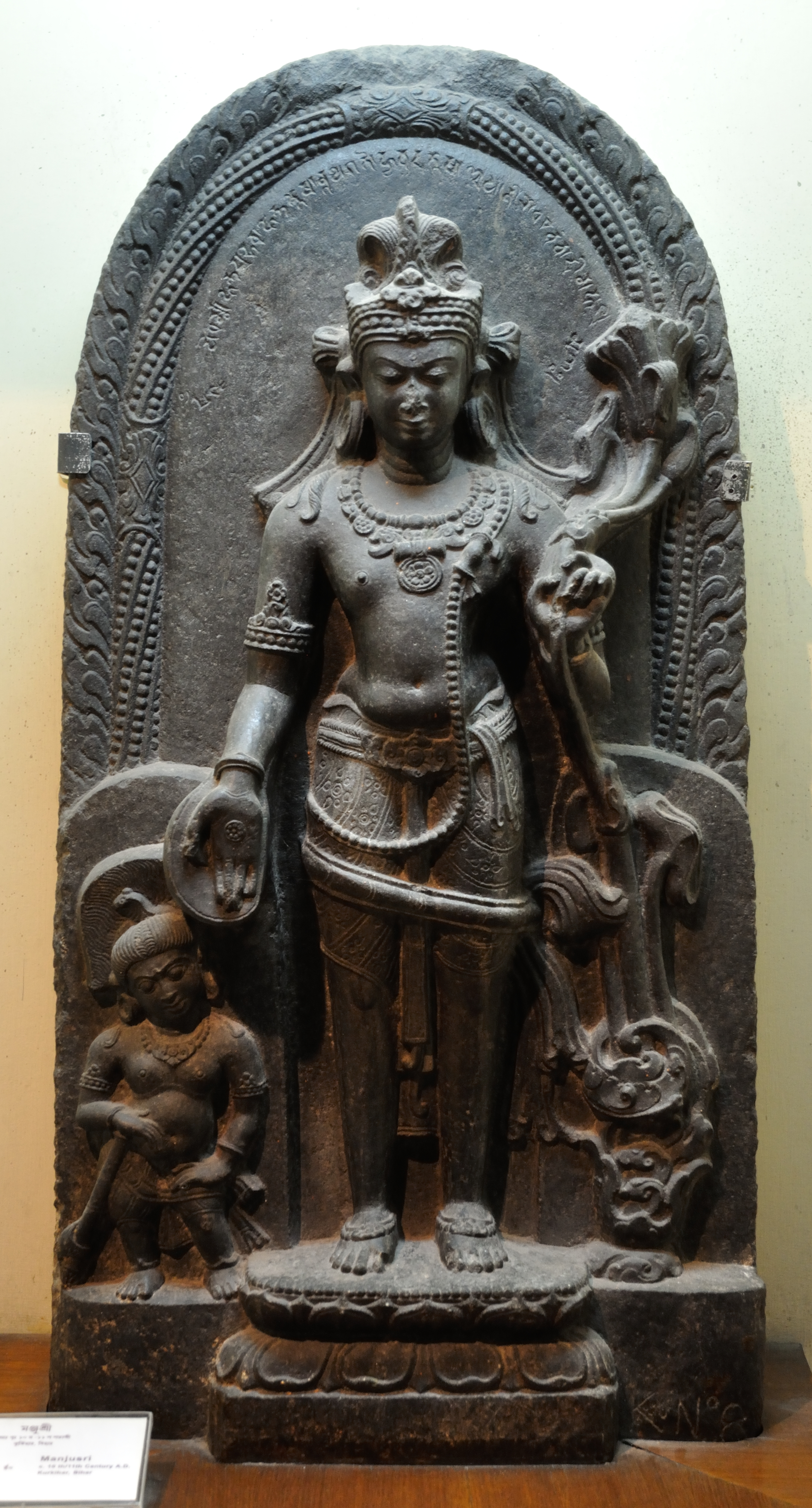
Manjusri - Circa 10th-11th Century AD

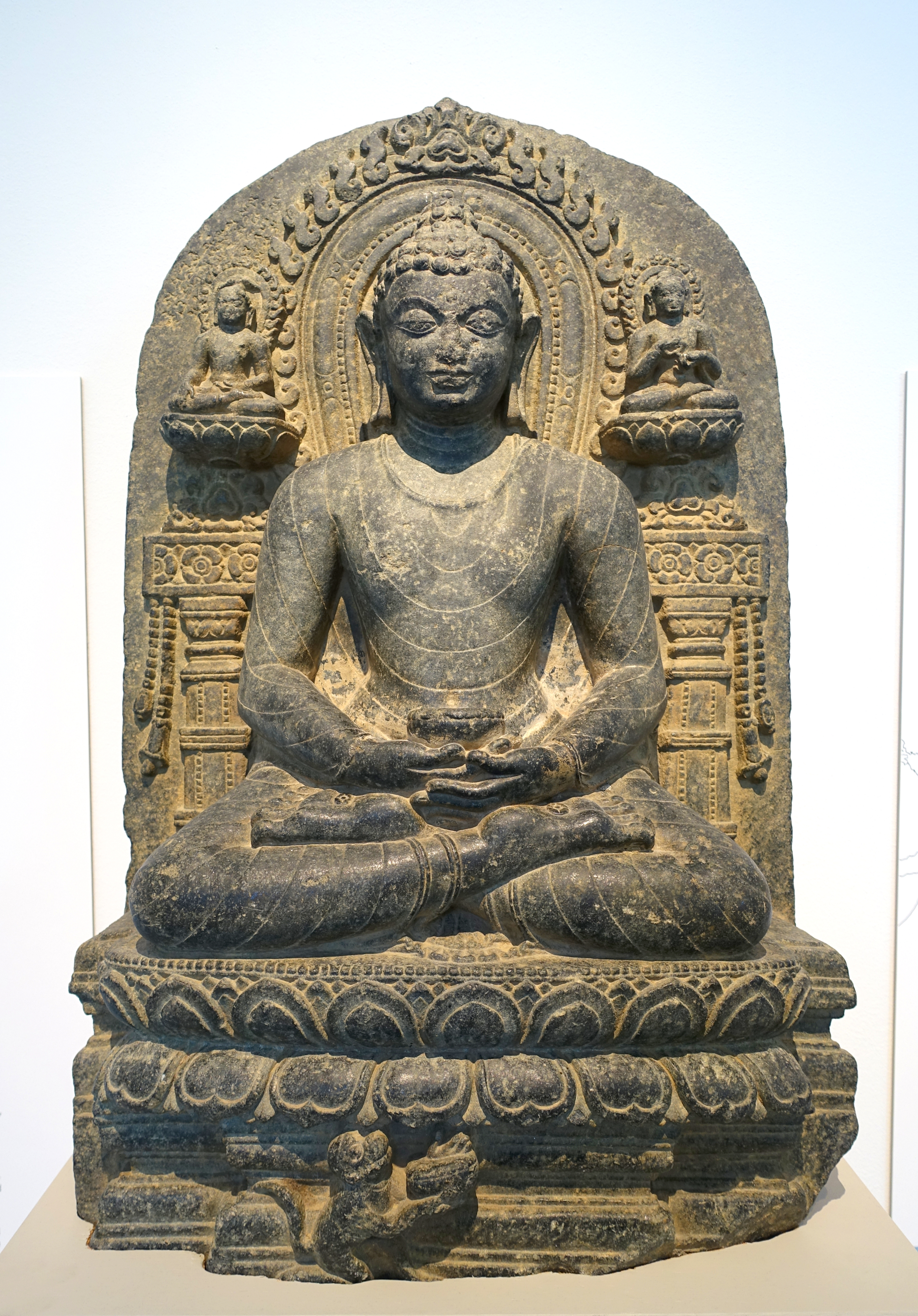
Monkey gives honey to Buddha Shakyamuni

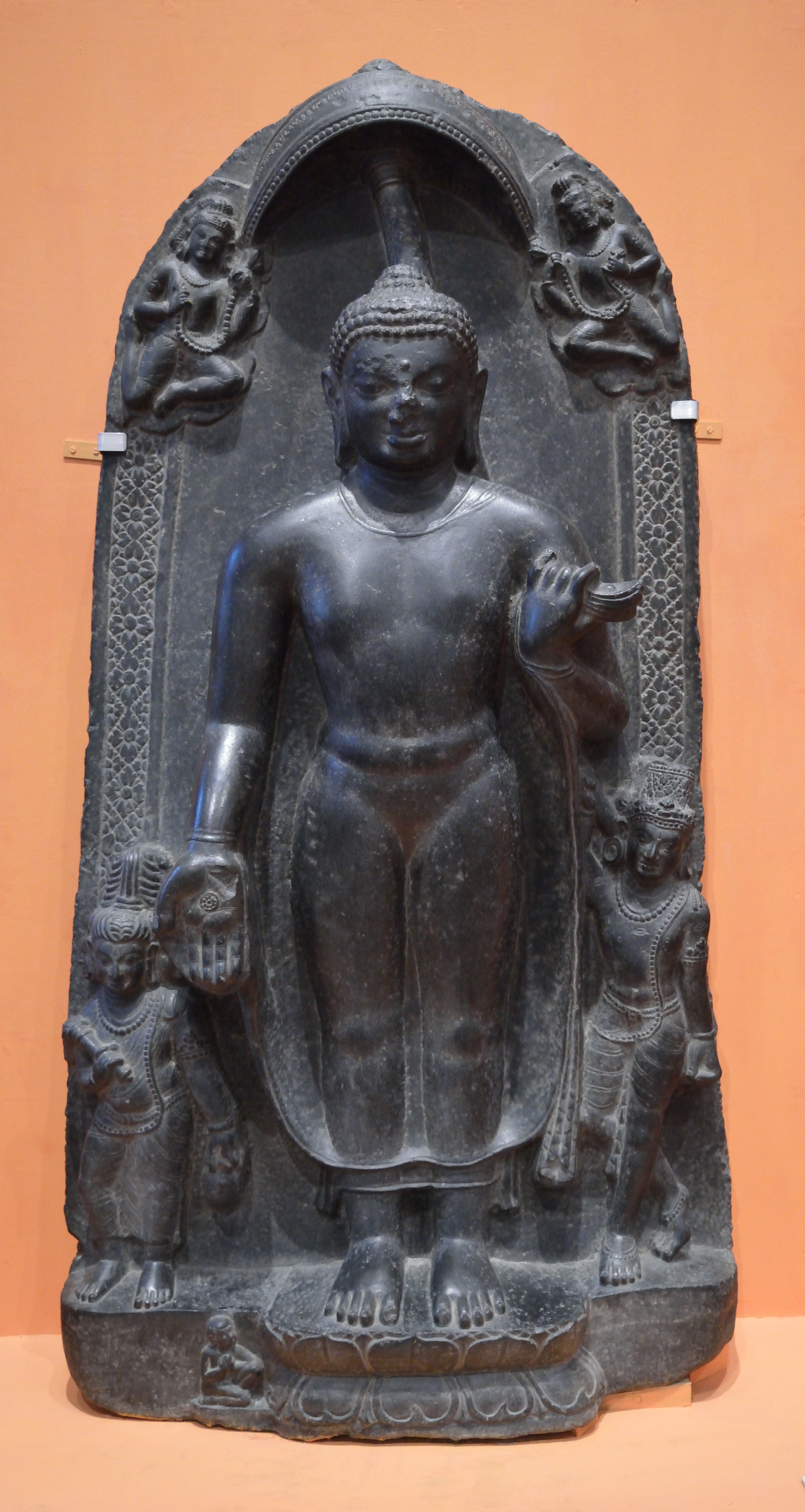
Buddhas Descent from Trayastrimsa Heaven Inscribed - Basalt - ca 10th Cent CE

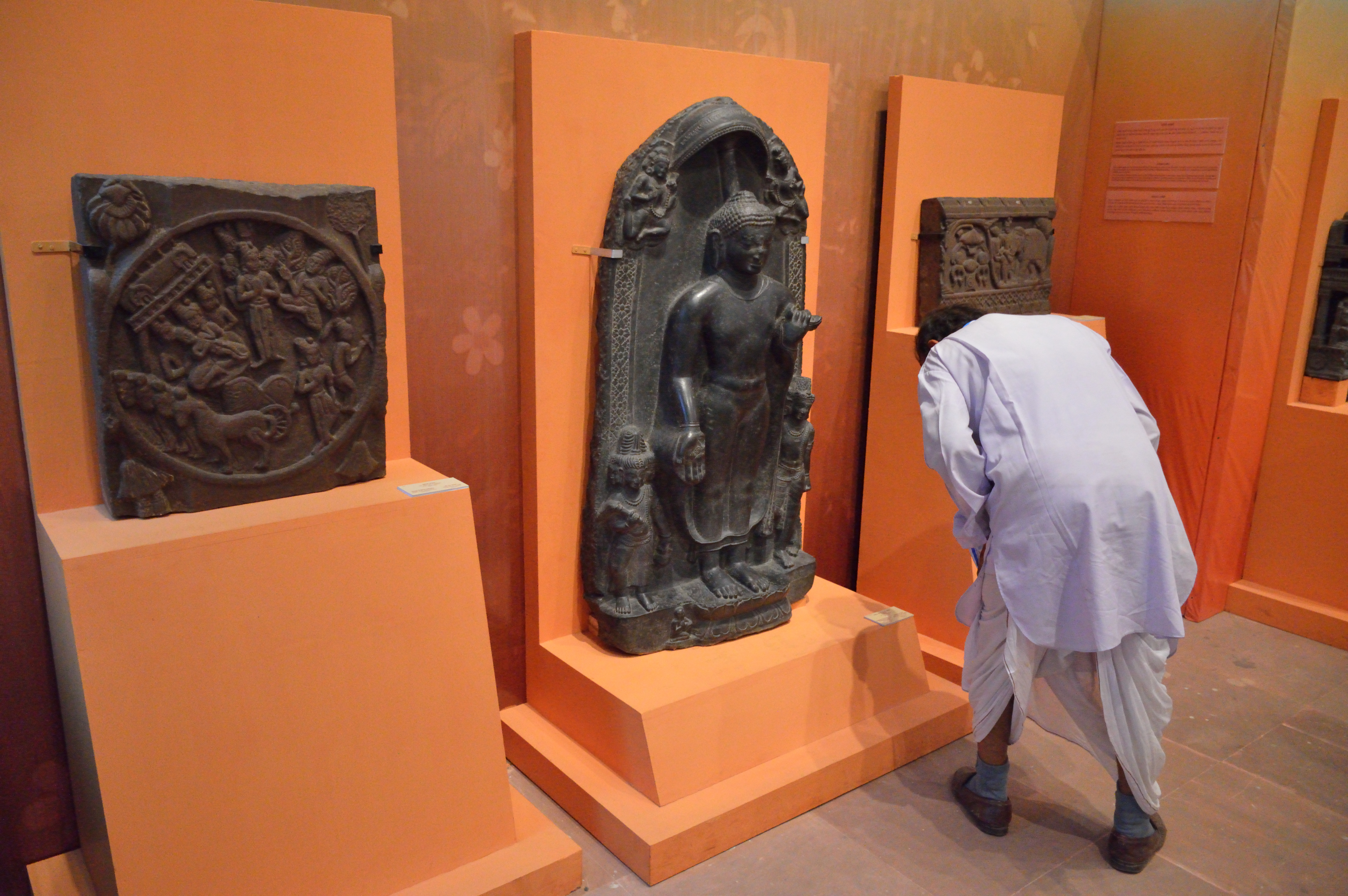
Indian Buddhist Art Exhibition Indian Museum - Kolkata 2016

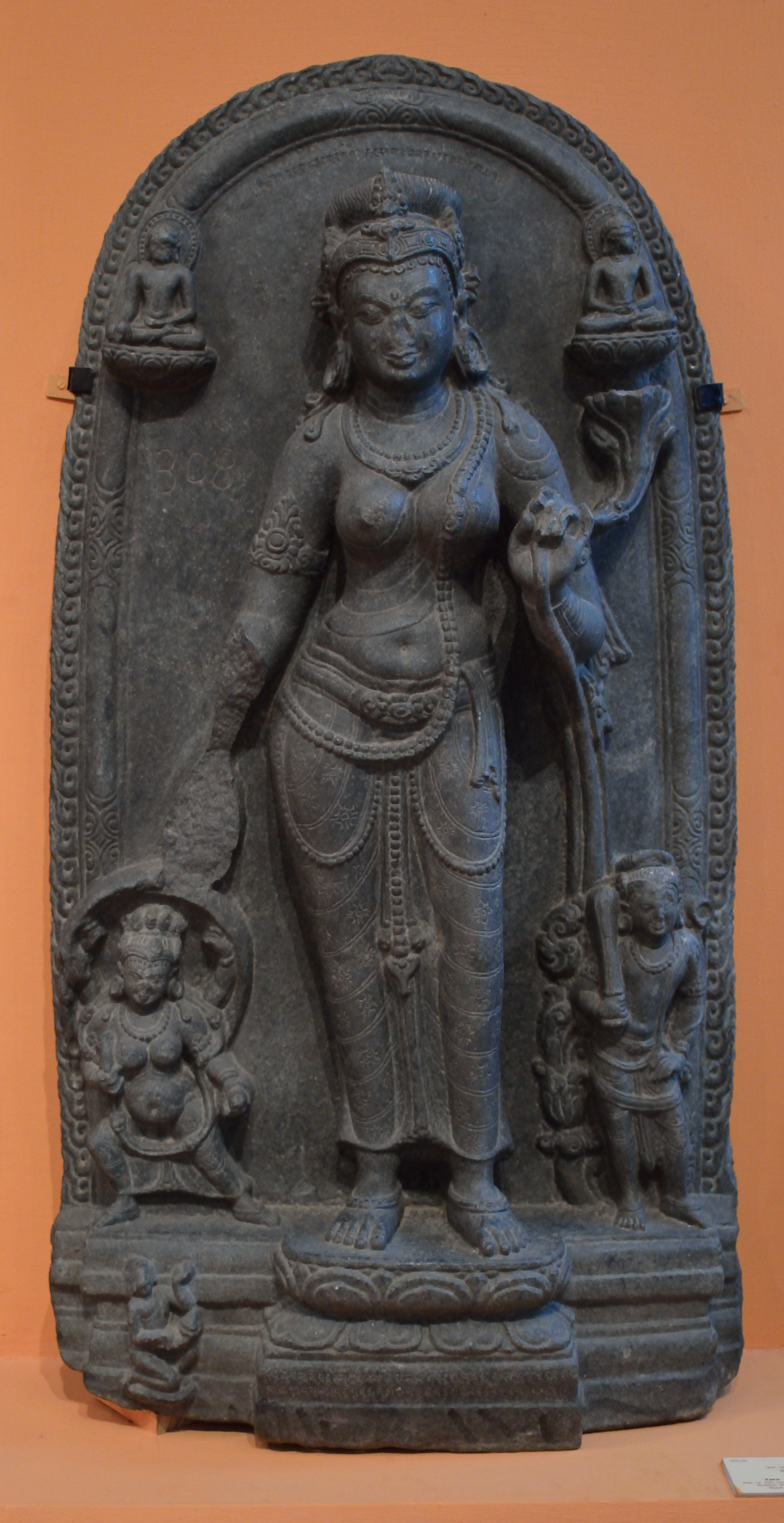
Tara - Basalt - ca 10th Century CE

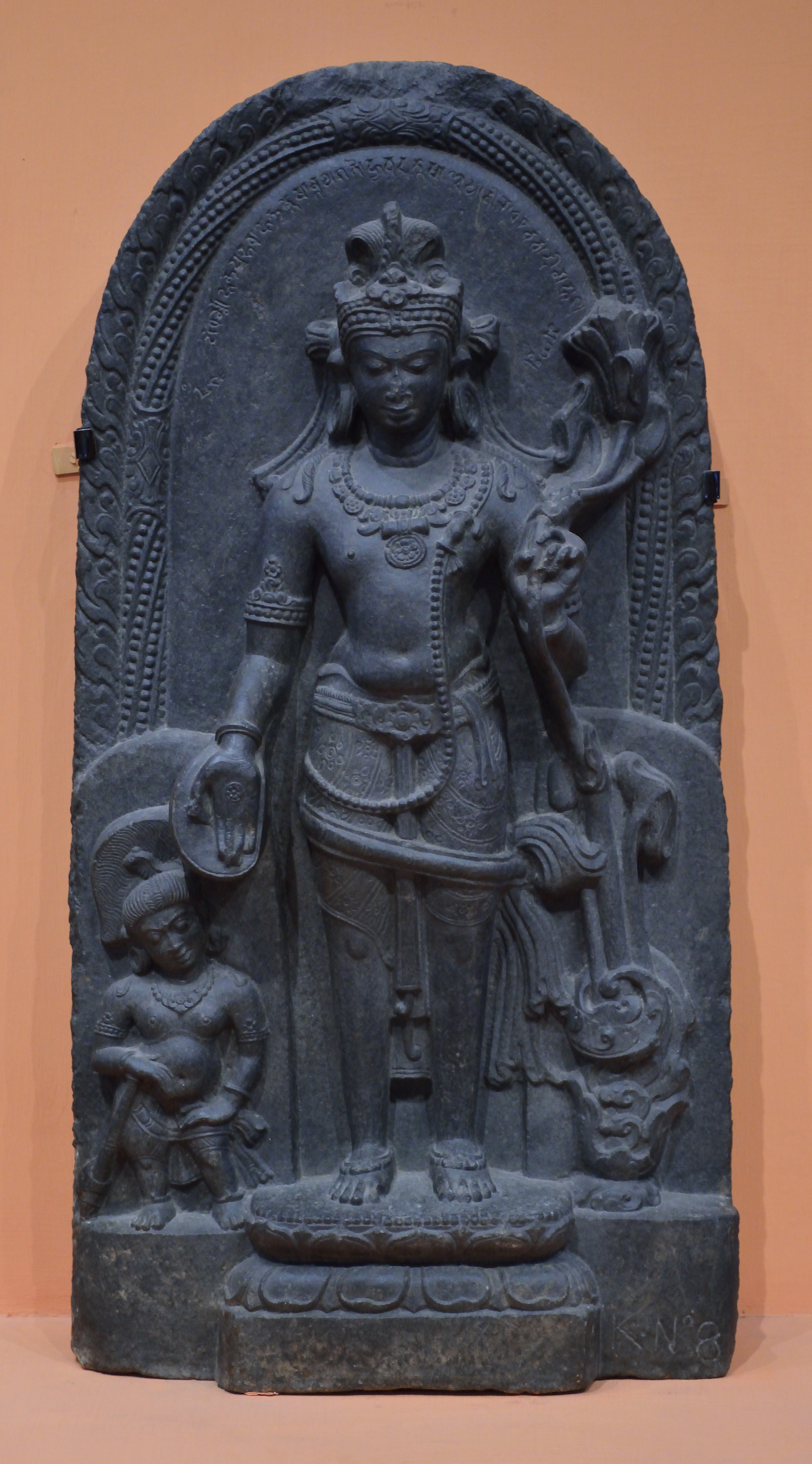
Manjusri_Inscribed_-_Basalt_-_ca_10th-11th_Cent

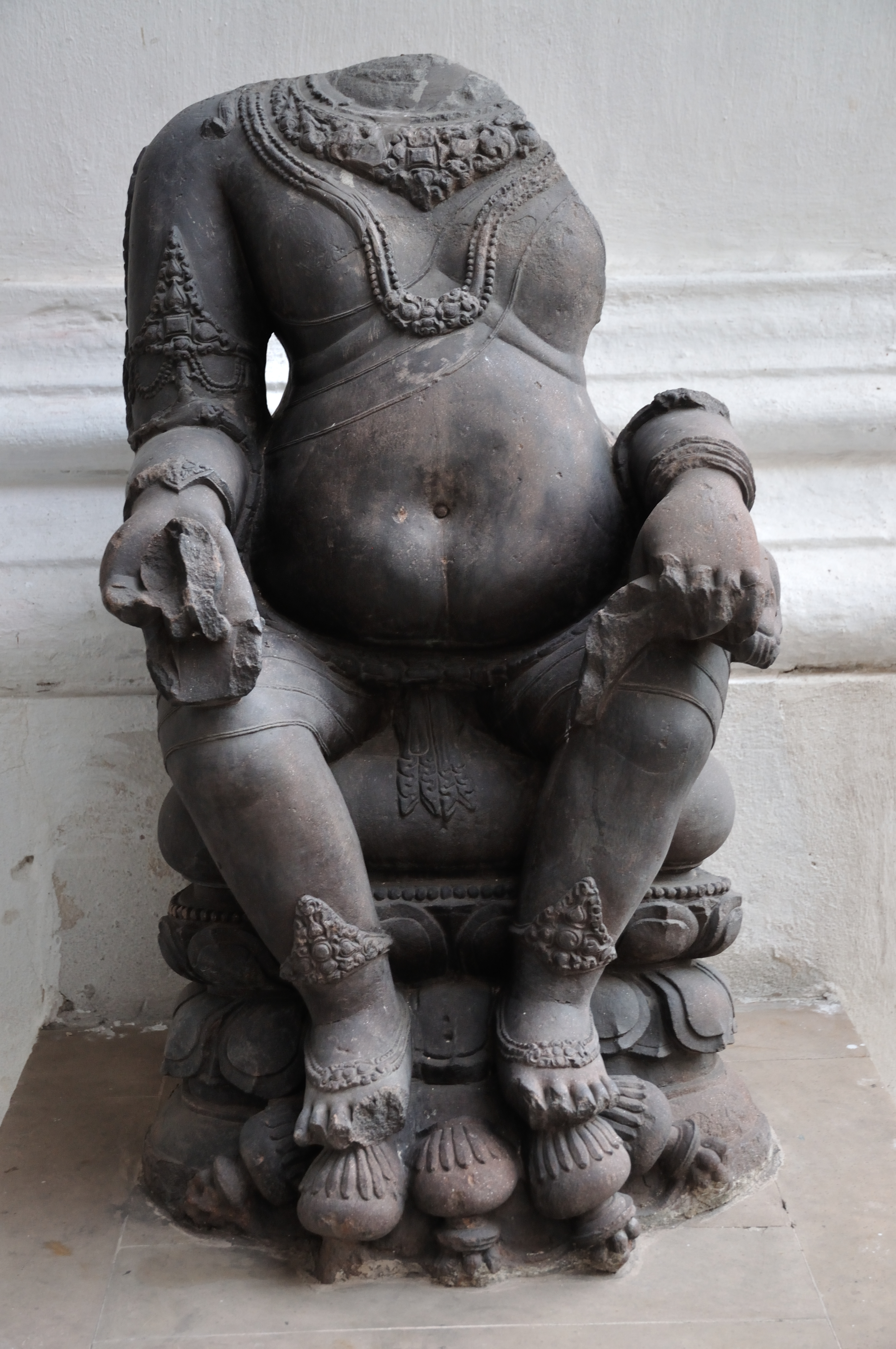
Jambhala - Circa - 10th Century AD - Kurkihar - Bihar - Indian Museum - Kolkata

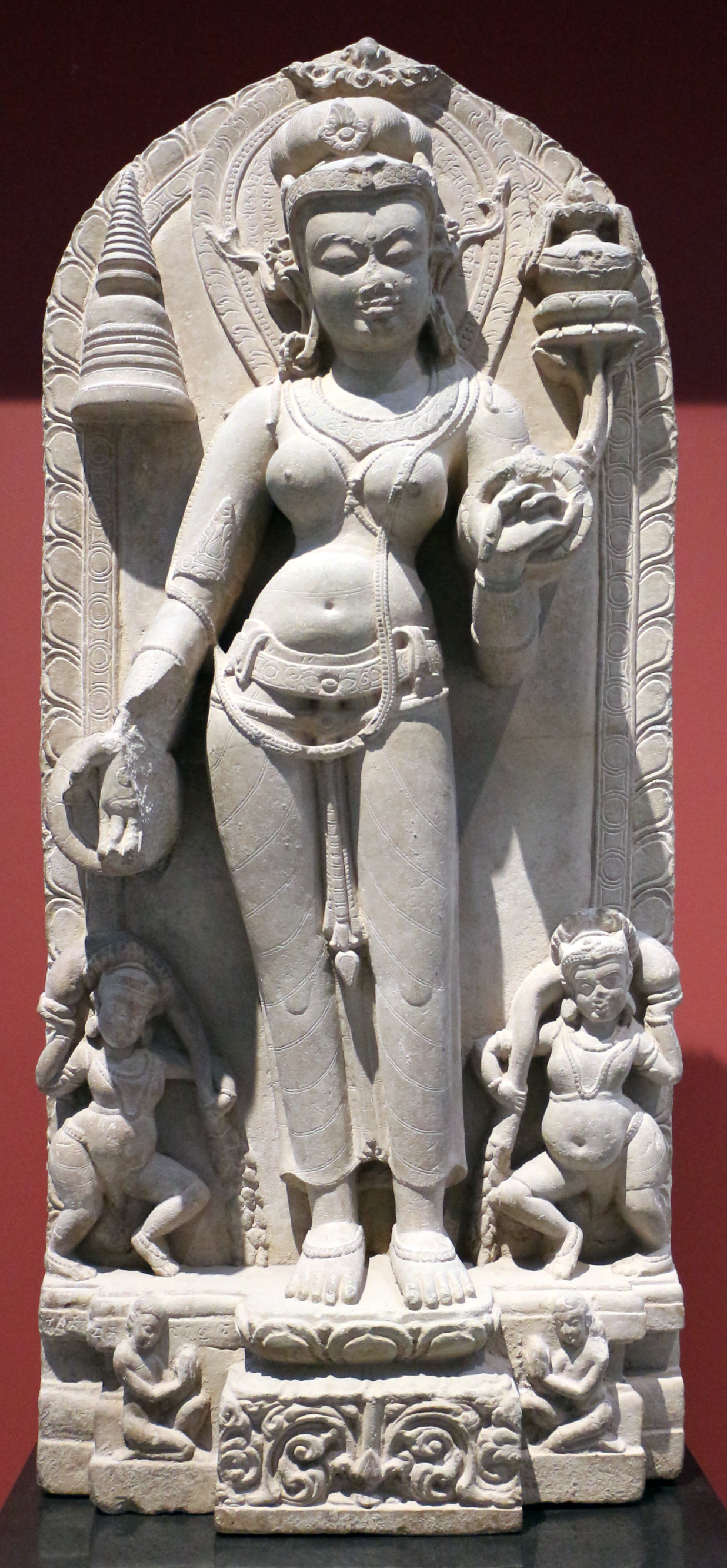
Vasudhara at Toledo Museum of Art, inscribed

== See also ==
- Akota Bronzes
- Buddhist art
- Jain Sculpture
- Indian art
- Chausa hoard
- Brahma from Mirpur-Khas
- Buddhism in Kanchipuram
