= List of State Protected Monuments in Jharkhand =

This is a list of State Protected Monuments as officially reported by and available through the website of the Archaeological Survey of India in the Indian state Jharkhand. The monument identifier is a combination of the abbreviation of the subdivision of the list (state, ASI circle) and the numbering as published on the website of the ASI. 3 State Protected Monuments have been recognized by the ASI in Jharkhand. Besides the State Protected Monuments, also the Monuments of National Importance in this state might be relevant.

== List of state protected monuments ==
SL. No.	Description	Location	Address	District	Coordinates	Image
S-JH-1	Maluti Temple	Dumka				Maluti Temple More images
S-JH-2	Jagannath Temple	Ranchi				Jagannath Temple More images
S-JH-3	Ancient Fort and Sangeet Dalan	Sahibganj				Upload Photo

== See also ==
- List of State Protected Monuments in India for other State Protected Monuments in India
- List of Monuments of National Importance in Jharkhand
