= Rajendra Prasad =

President of India from 1950 to 1962

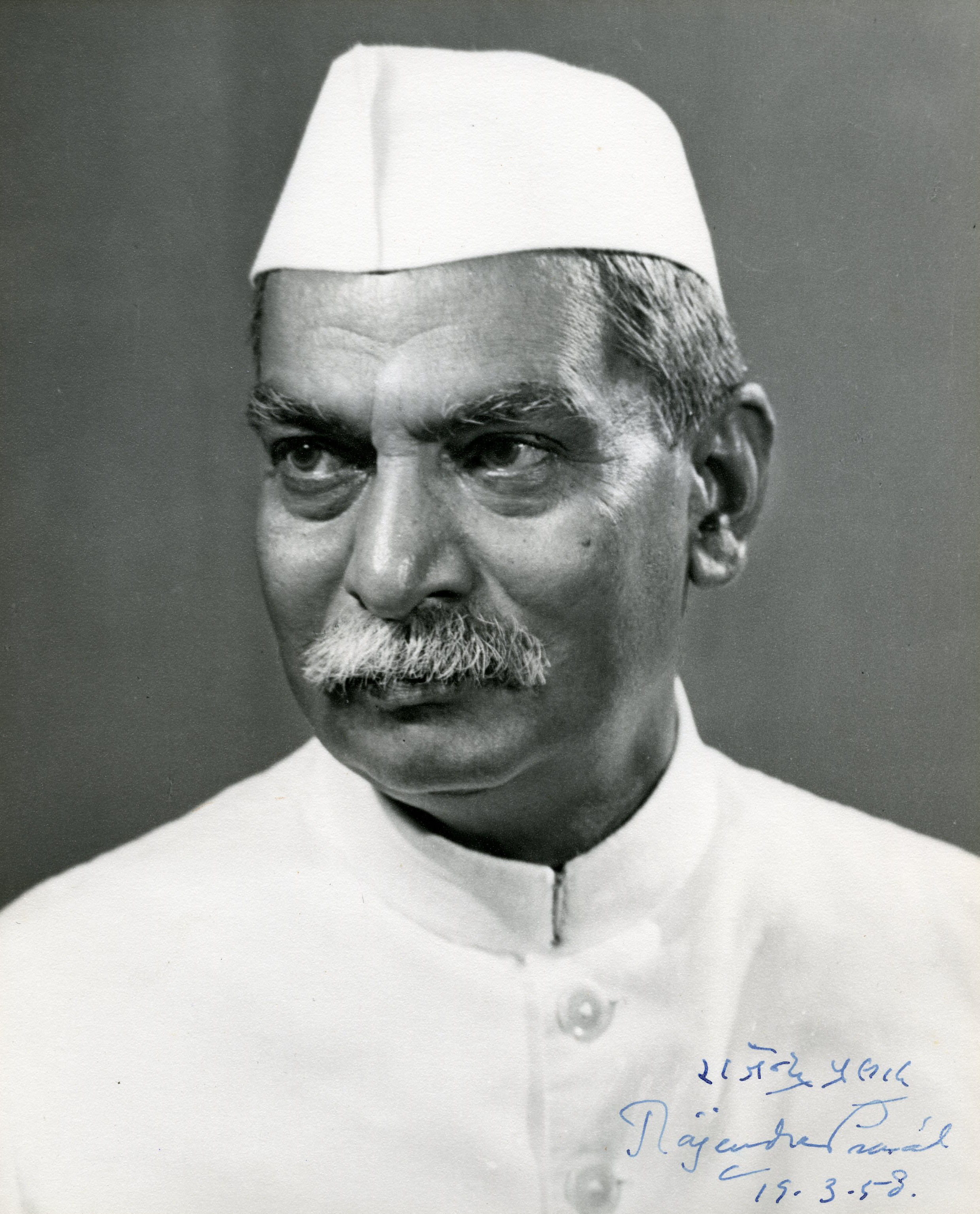
- Official portrait, 1950

President of India
- In office 13 February 1952 – 13 May 1962; Acting: 24 January 1950 – 13 February 1952
- Prime Minister: Jawaharlal Nehru
- Vice President: Sarvepalli Radhakrishnan
- Preceded by: Chakravarti Rajagopalachari as Governor-General of India
- Succeeded by: Sarvepalli Radhakrishnan

Union Minister of Agriculture
- In office 15 August 1947 – 14 January 1948
- Prime Minister: Jawaharlal Nehru
- Preceded by: Office established
- Succeeded by: Jairamdas Daulatram

President of Constituent Assembly of India
- In office 11 December 1946 – 24 January 1950
- Vice President: Harendra Coomar Mookerjee; V. T. Krishnamachari
- Preceded by: Sachchidananda Sinha
- Succeeded by: Office abolished

Personal details
- Born: 3 December 1884 Ziradei, Bengal Presidency, British India (now Bihar, India)
- Died: 28 February 1963 (aged 78) Patna, Bihar, India
- Party: Indian National Congress
- Spouse: Rajvanshi Devi (m. 1896; died 1962)
- Children: Mrityunjay Prasad
- Education: University of Calcutta
- Occupation: Politician; lawyer; journalist; scholar

Rajendra Prasad (3 December 1884 – 28 February 1963) was an Indian politician, lawyer, journalist and scholar who served as the first president of India from 1950 to 1962 for two terms. He joined the Indian National Congress during the Indian independence movement and became a major leader from the region of Bihar. A supporter of Mahatma Gandhi, Prasad was imprisoned by British authorities during the Salt Satyagraha of 1930 and the Quit India movement of 1942. After the constituent assembly 1946 elections, Prasad served as 1st Minister of Food and Agriculture in the central government from 1947 to 1948. Upon independence in 1947, Prasad was elected as President of the Constituent Assembly of India, which prepared the Constitution of India and which served as its provisional Parliament.

When India became a republic in 1950, Prasad was elected as its first president by the Constituent Assembly. As president, Prasad established a tradition for non-partisanship and independence for the office-bearer and retired from Congress party politics. Although a ceremonial head of state, Prasad encouraged the development of education in India and advised government on several occasions. In 1957, Prasad was re-elected to the presidency, becoming the only president to serve two full terms. Prasad stayed in office for the longest term of around 12 years. Post the completion of his tenure, he quit the Congress and set up new guidelines for parliamentarians which are still followed.

== Early life ==
Prasad was born on 3 December 1884 in a Kayastha family in Ziradei, Bengal Presidency, British India (now in Siwan district, Bihar, India). His father, Mahadev Sahai, was a scholar of both Sanskrit and Persian. His mother, Kamleshwari Devi, was a devout woman who would tell him stories from the Ramayana and Mahabharata. He was the youngest child and had one elder brother and three elder sisters. His mother died when he was a child, and his elder sister then took care of him.

== Student life ==
After the completion of traditional elementary education, he was sent to the Chhapra district School. Meanwhile, in June 1896, at the early age of 12, he was married to Rajavanshi Devi. He, along with his elder brother, Mahendra Prasad, then went to study at T.K. Ghosh's Academy in Patna for a period of two years. He secured first in the entrance examination to the University of Calcutta and was awarded Rs. 30 per month as a scholarship.

Prasad joined the Presidency College, Calcutta in 1902, initially as a science student. He passed the F. A. under the University of Calcutta in March 1904 and then graduated with a first division from there in March 1905. Impressed by his intellect, an examiner once commented on his answer sheet that the "examinee is better than examiner". Later he decided to focus on the study of arts and did his M.A. in Economics with a first division from the University of Calcutta in December 1907. There he lived with his brother in the Eden Hindu Hostel. A devoted student as well as a public activist, he was an active member of The Dawn Society. It was due to his sense of duty towards his family and education that he refused to join Servants of India Society, as it was during that time when his mother had died as well as his sister became a widow at the age of nineteen and had to return to her parents' home. Prasad was instrumental in the formation of the Bihari Students Conference in 1906 in the hall of Patna College. It was the first organisation of its kind in India and produced important leaders from Bihar like Anugrah Narayan Sinha and Shri Krishna Singh who played a prominent role in the Champaran Movement and Non-cooperation Movement.

== Career ==
=== A teacher ===
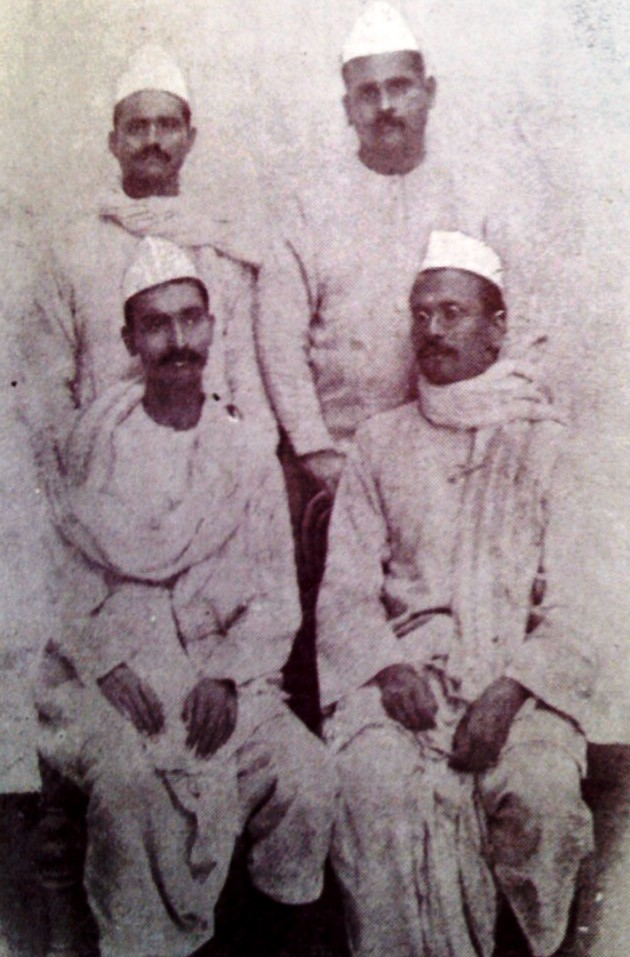
(Sitting Left) Prasad and Anugrah Narayan Sinha during Mahatma Gandhi's 1917 Champaran Satyagraha

Prasad served in various educational institutions as a teacher. After completing his M.A in economics, he became a professor of English at the Langat Singh College of Muzaffarpur in Bihar and went on to become the principal. However, later on he left the college to undertake legal studies and entered the Ripon College, Calcutta (now the Surendranath Law College). In 1909, while pursuing his law studies in Calcutta he also worked as Professor of Economics at Calcutta City College.

=== A lawyer ===
In 1915, Prasad appeared in the examination of master's in law from the Department of Law, University of Calcutta, passed the examination and won a gold medal. He completed his Doctorate in Law from Allahabad University. In 1916, he joined the High Court of Bihar and Odisha. In 1917, he was appointed as one of the first members of the Senate and of the Patna University. He also practised law at Bhagalpur, the famous silk town in Bihar.

=== Role in the freedom movement ===
Prasad had a major role in the Independence Movement. Prasad's first association with Indian National Congress was during 1906 annual session organised in Calcutta, where he participated as a volunteer, while studying in Calcutta. Formally, he joined the Indian National Congress in the year 1911, when the annual session was again held in Calcutta. During the Lucknow Session of Indian National Congress held in 1916, he met Mahatma Gandhi. During one of the fact-finding missions at Champaran, Mahatma Gandhi asked him to come with his volunteers. He was so greatly moved by the dedication, courage and conviction of Mahatma Gandhi that as soon as the motion of Non-Cooperation was passed by Indian National Congress in 1920, he retired from his lucrative career of lawyer as well as his duties in the university to aid the movement.

He also responded to the call by Gandhi to boycott Western educational establishments by asking his son, Mrityunjay Prasad, to drop out of his studies and enroll himself in Bihar Vidyapeeth, an institution he along with his colleagues founded on the traditional Indian model.

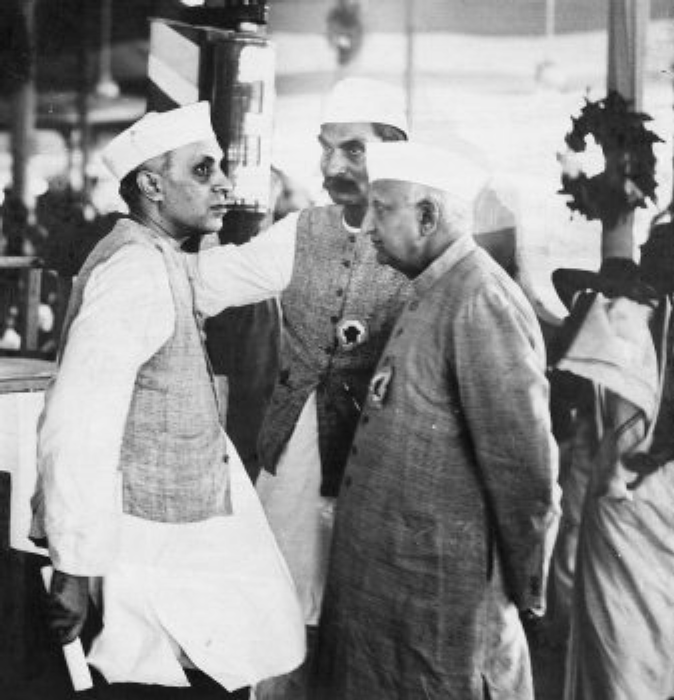
Jawaharlal Nehru, Bhulabhai Desai, and Rajendra Prasad (centre) at the AICC Session, March 1939

During the course of the independence movement, he interacted with Rahul Sankrityayan, a writer, and polymath. Sankrityayan was greatly influenced by Prasad's intellectual powers, finding him to be a guide and guru. In many of his articles he mentioned about his meeting with Sankrityayan and narrated about his meetings with Sankrityayan. He wrote articles for the revolutionary publications Searchlight and the Desh and collected funds for these papers. He toured widely, explaining, lecturing, and exhorting the principles of the independence movement.

He took an active role in helping people affected by the 1914 floods that struck Bihar and Bengal. When an earthquake affected Bihar on 15 January 1934, Prasad was in jail. During that period, he passed on the relief work to his close colleague Anugrah Narayan Sinha. He was released two days later and set up Bihar Central Relief Committee on 17 January 1934 and took on the task of raising funds to help the affected people. After the 31 May 1935 Quetta earthquake, when he was forbidden to leave the country due to government's order, he set up the Quetta Central Relief Committee in Sindh and Punjab under his own presidency.

He was elected as the President of the Indian National Congress during the Bombay session in October 1934. He again became the president when Subhash Chandra Bose resigned in 1939. On 8 August 1942, Congress passed the Quit India Resolution in Bombay which led to the arrest of many Indian leaders. Prasad was arrested in Sadaqat Ashram, Patna and sent to Bankipur Central Jail. After remaining incarcerated for nearly three years, he was released on 15 June 1945.

After the formation of Interim Government of 12 nominated ministers under the leadership of Jawaharlal Nehru on 2 September 1946, he was allocated the Food and Agriculture department. He was elected as the President of Constituent Assembly on 11 December 1946. On 17 November 1947 he became Congress President for a third time after J. B. Kripalani submitted his resignation.

== President of India (1950–1962) ==
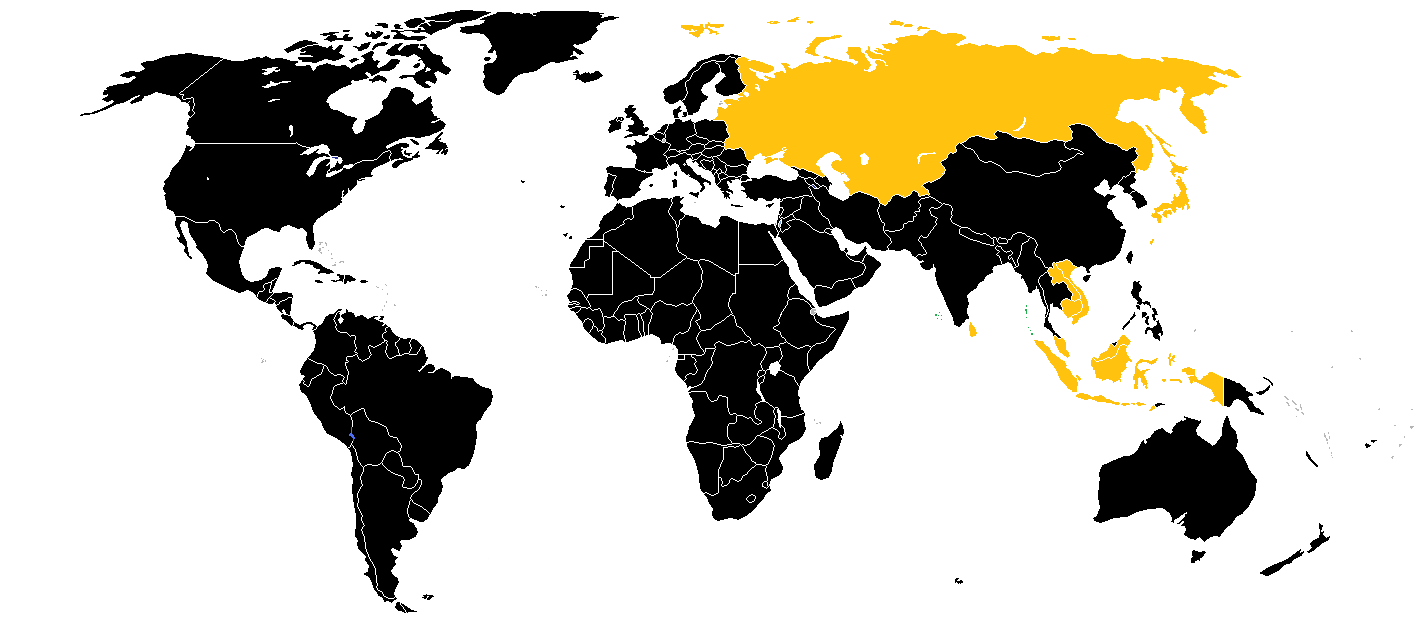
Between 1958 and 1960, President Prasad led 5 state visits to Japan, Ceylon, USSR, Indo-China, Malaya and Indonesia.

Two and a half years after independence, on 24 January 1950, the Constitution of independent India was ratified, and he was elected as the first President of India. On the night of 25 January 1950 (a day before the Republic Day of India), his sister Bhagwati Devi died. He arranged her cremation but only after his return from the parade ground.

=== Presidential election ===
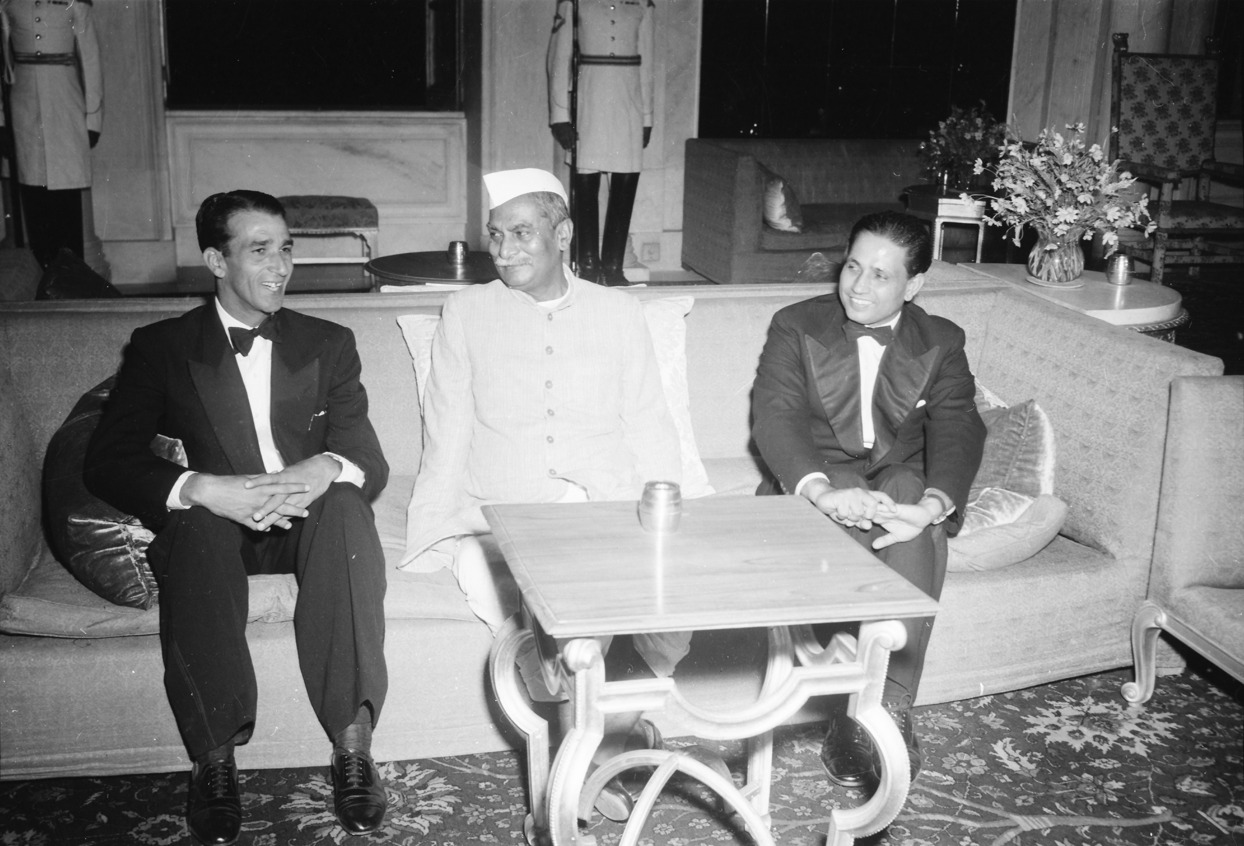
Captains Abdul Kardar (left) and Lala Amarnath (right) with Prasad (centre) on the day of the first test match between India and Pakistan, 16 October 1952

As the President of India, Prasad duly acted as required by the Constitution and was independent of any political party. He travelled the world extensively as an ambassador of India, building diplomatic rapport with foreign nations. He was re-elected for two consecutive terms in 1952 and 1957 and is the only President of India to achieve this feat. The Mughal Gardens at the Rashtrapati Bhavan were open to public for about a month for the first time during his tenure, and since then it has been a big attraction for people in Delhi and many other parts of the country.

Prasad acted independently of political parties, following the expected role of the president as required by the constitution. Following the tussle over the enactment of the Hindu Code Bill, he took a more active role in state affairs. In 1962, after serving 12 years as president, he announced his decision to retire. After relinquishing the office of the President of India in May 1962, he returned to Patna on 14 May 1962 and stayed on the campus of Bihar Vidyapeeth. His wife died on 9 September 1962, a month before Indo-China War. He was subsequently honoured with Bharat Ratna, the nation's highest civilian award.

He died on 28 February 1963, aged 78. Rajendra Smriti Sangrahalaya in Patna is dedicated to Prasad.

== Vegetarianism ==
Prasad was a life-long vegetarian and advocate of Ahimsa. He attended the 15th World Vegetarian Congress in 1957.

== Awards and honours ==
- India:
  - Bharat Ratna (1962)

== In popular culture ==
Babu Rajendra Prasad is 1980 short documentary film directed by Manjul Prabhat and produced by the Films Division of India which covers the life of the first president of India.

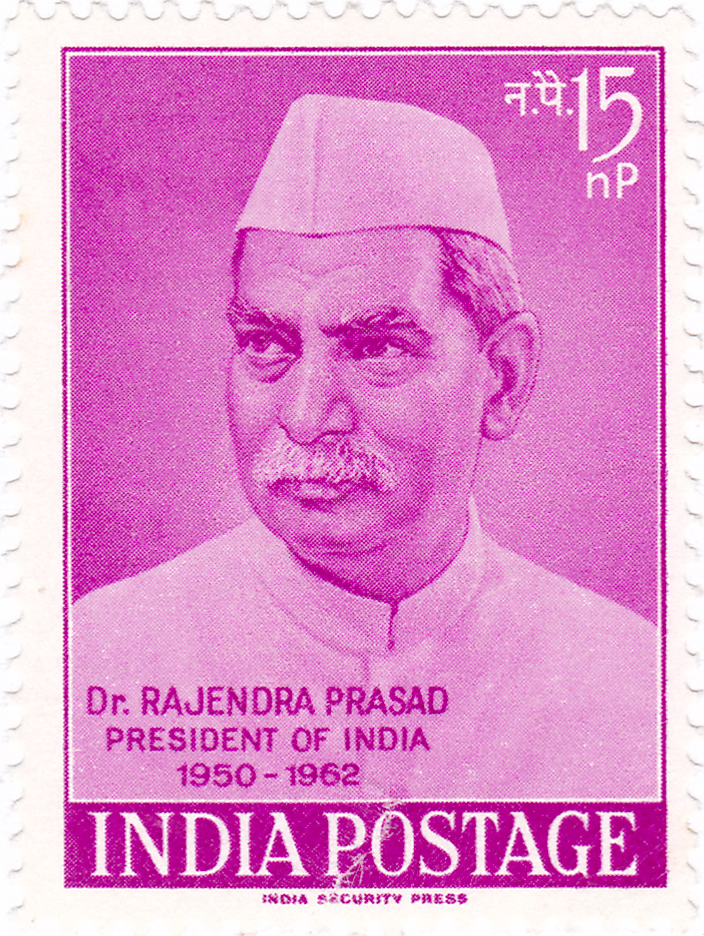
Prasad on stamp of India issued in 1962

Prasad's portrait as Congress president by Swamy (1948) issue of Chandamama magazine

Prasad's portrait as Congress president by Swamy (1948) issue of Chandamama magazine

== Bibliography ==
- Satyagraha at Champaran (1922)
- India Divided (1946)
- Atmakatha (1946), his autobiography written during his three-year prison term in Bankipur Jail
- Mahatma Gandhi and Bihar, Some Reminiscences (1949)
- Bapu Ke Qadmon Men (1954)
- Since Independence (published in 1960)
- Bharatiya Shiksha
- At the feet of Mahatma Gandhi

== See also ==
- List of politicians from Bihar

Political offices
Preceded by Chakravarthi Rajagopalachari as Governor General of India	President of India; 1950–1962	Succeeded by Sarvepalli Radhakrishnan
