= List of Monuments of National Importance in Jharkhand =

This is a list of Monuments of National Importance (ASI) as officially recognized by and available through the website of the Archaeological Survey of India in the Indian state Jharkhand. The monument identifier is a combination of the abbreviation of the subdivision of the list (state, ASI circle) and the numbering as published on the website of the ASI. 13 Monuments of National Importance have been recognized by the ASI in Jharkhand.

ASI Ranchi circle has descriptions images of these monuments.

== List of monuments of national importance ==
SL. No.	Description	Location	Address	District	Coordinates	Image
N-JH-1	Site of an old fort	Ruam		East Singhbhum	22°37′42″N 86°23′14″E	Upload Photo
N-JH-2	Forts and temples	Navratangarh	Sisai block	Gumla	23°06′43″N 84°47′07″E	Forts and temples More images
N-JH-3	Asura Sites	Hansa		Ranchi	22°59′26″N 85°16′43″E	Upload Photo
N-JH-4	Asura Sites	Kathartoli		Ranchi	22°58′45″N 85°18′36″E	Upload Photo
N-JH-5	Asura Sites	Khunti Tola		Ranchi	23°03′21″N 85°16′28″E	Upload Photo
N-JH-6	Asura Sites	Kunjla		Ranchi	23°02′36″N 85°15′12″E	Upload Photo
N-JH-7	Asura Sites	Saridkel		Ranchi	23°03′50″N 85°20′10″E	Upload Photo
N-JH-8	Ancient Stone Temple with a small Sivalinga inside	Khakhparta		Lohardaga	23°27′10″N 84°44′49″E	Ancient Stone Temple with a small Sivalinga inside More images
N-JH-9	Temples at Haradih	Haradih		Ranchi	23°08′48″N 85°41′40″E	Upload Photo
N-JH-10	Ruins of Baradari buildings with probable underground cells and passage	Arazimukimpur		Sahebganj	25°04′32″N 87°46′47″E	Upload Photo
N-JH-11	Jamma Masjid	Hadaf		Sahebganj	25°04′26″N 87°46′40″E	Jamma Masjid
N-JH-12	Ancient Mound locally known as Kulugarha and Basput	Itagarh		Seraikela Kharsawan	22°45′51″N 86°07′25″E	Upload Photo
N-JH-13	1. Benisagar tank; 2. Old remains of temple and sculptures on the south east bank of the above tank	Benisagar		West Singhbhum	21°59′06″N 85°53′26″E	1. Benisagar tank 2. Old remains of temple and sculptures on the south east bank of the above tank; More images

== See also ==
- List of Monuments of National Importance in India for other Monuments of National Importance in India
- List of State Protected Monuments in Jharkhand
