= Azazul Haque =

Indian politician

MLA, Bihar Legislative Assembly
- In office 2000–2005
- Preceded by: Sheo Shanker Yadav
- Succeeded by: Shyam Bahadur Singh
- Constituency: Ziradei

Personal details
- Party: Samras Samaj Party
- Other political affiliations: Rashtriya Janata Dal (2000-2010)
- Relations: Mohammad Shahabuddin (brother-in-law)

Azazul Haque is an Indian politician from Bihar. A two-time Member of Legislative Assembly from the Ziradei constituency (2000-2005), he served as a minister of state in the Rabri Devi government. He left the Rashtriya Janata Dal (RJD) to join Samras Samaj Party in 2010. His name is also transliterated as Ejaz-ul-Haq.

Azazul Haque hails from Khalispur, Siwan. His father's name is Wajid Hussain.

Haque won the 2000 Bihar Assembly elections as an RJD candidate from Ziradei. He received 63.2% of the votes, defeating Shyam Bahadur Singh of Samata Party. He again won the February 2005 elections, he again defeated Singh who fought as a Janata Dal (United) candidate this time. However, Haque's vote share decreased to 43.66%. Haque was a minister of state in the Rabri Devi government. He was named by gangster Bhupendra Tyagi (aka Awadhesh Tyagi) as the supplier of weapons for use in an alleged plot to kill journalist Tarun Tejpal. Haque was a minister of state in the Rabri Devi government.

Shyam Bahadur Singh defeated Haque in the October 2005 elections. Haque received 32.54% of the votes, compared to Singh's 49.32%. Haque resigned from RJD in 2010, after the party denied him a ticket for the 2010 Assembly elections. He then became the state president of the little-known Samras Samaj Party. He unsuccessfully contested the 2010 elections from the Narkatiya constituency, as an independent candidate.

In July 2015, an 18-year-old man Raghvendra Singh stabbed Haque at the latter's apartment in Patna. Singh then fled with Haque's SUV and his licensed revolver. Haque was admitted to hospital with multiple stab wounds, after his neighbours alerted the police. Haque told the police that three robbers had barged into his apartment, and fled away with his SUV, ₹ 30,000 in cash and his revolver after stabbing him. The police traced Singh's cellphone to Arrah, and arrested him. During questioning, he claimed that he was employed as a data entry operator by Haque four days prior to the incident. He insisted that he attacked Haque in self-defense, after Haque tried to sexually assault him. He also stated that he didn't steal any cash or the revolver; the revolver was present in the SUV which he used to escape. The police checked the CCTV footage of Haque's apartment building, and did not find any evidence of three men being involved in the incident, as claimed by Haque.
