= Tarwara =

Tarwara Village
- Village
- Location of Siwan in Bihar
- Coordinates: 26.19949°N 84.48868°E
- Country: India
- State: Bihar
- Administrative division: Saran
- Headquarters: Siwan, Bihar

Government
  - Lok Sabha constituency: Siwan
  - Assembly seat: Barharia

Population (2014 census)
  - Total: 10,250

Demographics
  - Literacy: 60 per cent
  - Sex ratio: 1,025 (Males: 5,057- 49%, Females: 5,187- 51%)
- PIN: 841506
- Major highways: NH-227A

Tarwara is a village panchayat, and the most developed village located in the Siwan district of Bihar state, India, around 90.6 kilometres (56.3 mi) from Patna, the state capital. The other surrounding state capitals are Ranchi (326.5 km or 202.9 mi), Lucknow (390.3 km or 242.5 mi), and Gangtok (428.6 km or 266.3 mi).

== Geography ==
Situated on the bank of Gandak River one of the major rivers of Nepal and a left bank tributary of the Ganges in India. It is also called Krishna Gandaki in Nepal.

It originates between Tibet and Mount Everest at an elevation of 6,268 metres (20,564 ft) at the Nhubine Himal Glacier in the Mustang region of Nepal.

The Gandak river is mentioned in the ancient Sanskrit epic Mahabharata and Its evolution is described in Shiva Purana, Kumarakhand, in the chapter of the killing of Shankhachuda.

Tarwara is located in the UTC 5:30 time zone and follows Indian standard time (IST).

== Demographics ==
According to the 2011 census Tarwara has a population of 10,244,

- There are 1,640 households in Tarwara.
- There are 5,057 males (49%); There are 5,187 females (51%).
- Scheduled Cast are 1,125 (11%)
- Total Scheduled Tribe are 339 (3% ).
- Literates in Tarwara are 6,102 (60%).
- There are 4,142 total illiterates (40% ).
- Workers are 2,645 (26%). 2,006 are regular and 639 are Irregular.
- There are 7,599 Non Workers (74%).

=== Sex ratio ===
While the population is 10,244, there are 5,057 males in the State (49%) and 5,187 females are there (51%). Further the children below 6 years of age are 1,752 of which 907 are males and 845 are females.

Population sex-wise	Children
Males: 5,057- 49%.	Male children below 6 years of age: 907
Females: 5,187- 51%.	Female children below 6 years of age: 845

=== Scheduled caste and tribes ===
Total scheduled caste in the State are 1,125 and comes to 11% of the total population. Total scheduled tribes are 339 which comes to 3% of the total population.

Scheduled caste	Scheduled tribe
Total scheduled caste: 1,125- 11%.	Total scheduled tribes: 339- 3%
Male S.C: 547.	Male S.T: 174.
Female S.C: 578.	Female S.T: 165.

=== Literacy rate ===
Literates in the state is 6,102, which is about 60% in the population of which males are 3,362 and females are 2,740. There are 4,142 illiterates in this state which comes to around 40% of the state's population.

Literates	Illiterates
Total Lliterates: 6,102- 60%.	Total illiterates: 4,142- 40%.
Male literates: 3,362- 33%.	Male illiterates: 1,695- 17%.
Female literates: 2,740- 27%.	Female illiterates: 2,447- 24%.

=== Working population ===
Workers in the State of Tarwara are calculated as 2,645 which is 26% of the state population of which 2,133 are males and 512 are females. Further 2,006 are regular and 639 are irregular i.e. get jobs only few days in a month. There are 7,599 non-workers in this state which is about 74%. This calculation of non-workers include students, housewives and children above 6 years.

Total workers	Non-workers
Workers: 2,645- 26%	Non-workers: 7,599- 74%
Male: 2,133- 21%	Male: 2,924- 29%
Female: 512- 5.00%%	Female: 4,675- 46%

Regular workers	Irregular workers
Regular workers: 2,006- 20%	Irregular workers: 639- 6%
Male : 1,678- 0%	Male: 455- 4%
Female: 328- 3%	Female: 184- 2%

== Election results ==
In the 2020 state assembly elections, Bacha Pandey RJD won the Barharia assembly seat defeating Shyam Bahadur Singh of JD(U). In the 2019 Lok Sabha elections, Kavita Singh of JDU won the Siwan Lok sabha seat defeating Heena Shahab of RJD.

== History ==
Tarwara, Siwan, situated in the western part of the State, was originally a sub-division of Saran District, which in ancient days formed a part of Kosala Kingdom. Siwan became a fully-fledged district when it was split from Saran in 1976.

Siwan derived its name from "Shiva Man", a Bandh Raja whose heirs ruled this area till Babar’s arrival. Maharajganj, which is another subdivision of Siwan district, may have found its name from the seat of the Maharaja there. A recently excavated marvellous statue of Vishnu at Village Bherbania from underneath a tree indicates that there were large numbers of followers of Lord Vishnu. Currently it is not located as border district of Bihar. The Gorkha king had briefly extended his kingdom to Siwan for a few years in the 1790s before the British started their rule and repulsed the Gorkhas and that is how the name got stuck to the region. It is now dominated by Yadavs and Rajputs.

Siwan was a part of Banaras Kingdom during the 8th century. Muslims came here in the 13th century. Sikandar Lodi brought this area in his kingdom in the 15th century. Babar crossed Ghaghra river near Siswan in his return journey. In the end of the 17th century, the Dutch came first followed by the English. After the battle of Buxar in 1765 it became a part of Bengal. Siwan played an important role in 1857 independence movement. It is famous for the stalwart and sturdy ‘Bhoj-puries’, who have always been noted for their martial spirit and physical endurance and from whom the army and police personnel were largely drawn. A good number of them rebelled and rendered their services to Babu Kunwar Singh. The anti pardah movement in Bihar was started by Sri Braj Kishore Prasad who also belonged to Siwan in response to the Non Co-Operative movement in 1920.

=== Historical places near Tarwara ===
Korara
A village in Mairwa Blcok, which is situated at 2 km south from Mairwa Dham. where there is the first Sai temple of siwan district along with temple of Lord Shiva and Mother Durga.

Don
A village in the Darauli block where there are remnants of a fort, which is said to be connected with the famous hero of the Mahabharat, Acharya Dronacharya the guru of both Kaurava and Pandav. Dona's stupa is a lesser-known but popular Buddhist pilgrimage site, despite its isolated location. The Buddhist traveller Hiuen Tsang mentions a visit to Don in his account of his travels in India. He describes the stupa as being in ruins. The account of Dona's distribution of Buddha's ashes and being given the vessel is a mentioned in the end of the Mahaparinibbana Sutta, which is described in Maurice Walsh's The Long Discourses. Presently Dona's stupa is a grassy hill and has a Hindu temple built over it, where a beautiful statue of Tara is worshipped as a Hindu goddess. This statue was carved in the 9th century. A.D. Tourists on a Buddhist Pilgrimage Tour are sure to appreciate the historic sight of the stupa at Don.

Maharajganj
A block headquarters now, it was also called Basnauli Gangar. It is the largest bazaar in the district. This was the place where great hero of Indian Independence Movement, Shri Phulena Prasad centralised his activity and fought against the British.

Mehandar
A village in Siswan Blcok, where there is a temple of Shiva and Vishwakarma which is visited by the people of the locality on the Shivaratri day & Vishwakarma Puja (17 Sept) Day. It is known for its temple and a pond scattered over an area of more than 52 bighas. It is said that one Nepal king built these and took his bath in the pond and got his leprosy cured.

Bhikhabandh
A village in Maharajganj Block, there is a big tree under the shade of which Bhaiya-Bahini temple is situated. The story runs that these brother and sister fought Mughal sepoys in the 14th century and died here in course of fighting.

Sohagara
A place in the Guthani block, there is a famous temple of Lord Shiva (Hansnath baba), 40 km from the district headquarters (Siwan) just at the border of district Deoria of Uttar Pradesh.

Papaur
A place where Mahatma Budh is said to have taken his last breath and then after he was taken to Kushinagar

== Languages ==
The native languages of Tarwara are Bhojpuri, Hindi and Urdu but the native dialect is Bhojpuri, (an Indo-Aryan language).

== Culture ==
Tarwara shares many cultural roots with neighboring state and country Uttar Pradesh and Nepal respectively. A regular Bihari meal consists of daal, bhaat (rice), roti, tarkari (vegetables) etc. Bihari cuisine is predominantly vegetarian because traditional Bihar society, influenced by Buddhist and Hindu values of non-violence, did not eat eggs, chicken, fish and other animal products. However, there is also a tradition of meat-eating, and fish dishes are especially common due to the number of rivers and ponds in Tarwara. There are also numerous Bihari meat dishes, with chicken and mutton being the most common.

== Notable personalities ==
- Guru Dronacharya of Mahabharat - The royal guru to Kauravas and Pandavas and was a master of advanced military arts, including the divine weapons or Divya Astras.
- Rajendra Prasad - A freedom fighter, politician, (president) architect of the Constitution of India and First President of India.
- Satyendra Dubey - An IES officer, whistle blower in golden highway project against corruption. A movie Manjunath (film) was released in his remembrance on 9 May 2014 .
- Mahamaya Prasad Sinha - He was the chief minister of Bihar from March 1967 to Jan 1968.
- Brajkishore Prasad-Who started the anti Pardah Movement. He was well-known pioneer of the non-co-operation movement of 1920 with Mahatma Gandhi
- Syed Ali Akhtar Rizvi - A Twelver Shī'ah scholar, speaker, author, historian and poet. He was popularly known as "Adeeb-E-Asr" as a scholar and "Sha'oor" as a poet.
- Prabhavati Devi - She was at the forefront of freedom struggle in Bihar and the wife of Loknayak Jaipraksh Narayan (under him India formed the first Non-Congress government in Centre)
- Natwarlal - Hardly people know his real name Mithilesh Kumar Srivastava, was a noted Indian confidence trickster known for having repeatedly "sold" the Taj Mahal, the Red Fort and the Rashtrapati Bhavan and also the Parliament House of India along with its 545 sitting members. He was a living-legend in his lifetime and a legend even after his death.
- Mohammad Shahabuddin (Indian politician) - A former member of parliament who was elected four times from Siwan, Bihar, with the Rashtriya Janata Dal (RJD), and was elected twice as MLA, to the Bihar Vidhan Sabha (Legislative Assembly)
- Khuda Bakhsh - Created a public library from the precious collections of his father and making his own valuable collection of books, which was later named as “Oriental Public Library”.

== Education ==
Schools in Tarwara are either government schools (run by the state or central government) or private schools (run by trusts or individuals), many of which are religious. The schools are affiliated either with the Bihar School Examination Board (BSEB), National Institute of Open Schooling (NIOS) or the Central Board of Secondary Education (CBSE) boards.

Under the 10+2+3 plan, students complete ten years of schooling and then enroll in schools that have a higher secondary facility and are affiliated with the Bihar Intermediate Education Council (BIEC), the All-India Council for the Indian School Certificate Examinations (CISCE), the NIOS or the CBSE, where they select one of three streams: arts, commerce, or science.

Schools in Tarawa include:

- Maulana Mazharul Haque Degree College, Tarwara
- Gandak High School, Tarwara
- Primary/Secondary School chaudhary Patti, Tarwara
- Children's Rise High School, Tarwara
- St. Joseph Mission School, Tarwara
- Master Academy, Tarwara
- Modern Academy Tarwara
- Paradise international school Tarwara

== Transport ==
Tarwara is well-connected by National Highway NH-227A

=== Nearest Railway stations ===
- Pachrukhi Railway Station (9.0 km or 5.6 mi)
- Siwan Junction (14.0 km or 8.7 mi),
- Duraundha Jn railway station (12.3 km or 7.6 mi)
- Amlori Sarsar railway station (18.0 km or 11.2 mi)
- Chainwa railway station (19.2 km or 11.9 mi)
- Jiradei railway station (25.4 km or 15.8 mi)
- Sidhwalia railway station (23.7 km or 14.7 mi)

=== Nearest airports ===
- Kushinagar Airport, Kushinagar (86.1 km or 53.5 mi)
- Lok Nayak Jayaprakash Airport, Patna (91.1 km or 56.6 mi)
- Gorakhpur Airport, Gorakhpur
