= Amarjeet Kushwaha =

Indian activist, lawyer and politician

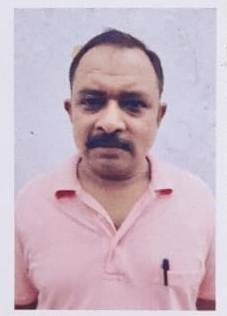

Member Of Bihar Legislative Assembly
- In office 2020–2025
- Preceded by: Ramesh Singh Kushwaha
- Succeeded by: Bhism Pratap Singh Kushwaha
- Constituency: Ziradei

Personal details
- Born: 21 May 1973 (age 53)
- Party: Communist Party Of India (Marxist-Leninist) Libration
- Spouse: Maya Devi
- Education: M.M.M. PG College, Bhatpar Rani (B.A.) Deen Dayal Upadhyay Gorakhpur University (LLB)

Amarjeet Kushwaha is an Indian activist, lawyer and politician. He was elected as member of Bihar legislative assembly in 2020 from 106th Ziradei constituency. He is a leader in the Communist Party of India (Marxist–Leninist) Liberation. He was the national president of the Revolutionary Youth Association in India. In 2020 he defeated his near rival Kamla Devi from Ziradei seat with a margin of more than 25000 votes.

== Personal life and education ==
Amarjeet Kushwaha was brought up in the Siwan district of Bihar. He attended the M.M.M. PG College, Bhatparrani, Deoria and graduated with a Bachelor of Arts degree. Later he got a graduation for a second time with a Bachelor of Laws degree from Gorakhpur University. Kushwaha is married to Maya Devi.

== Activism ==
During his course in Gorakhpur University, Kushwaha joined the Communist Party of India (Marxist–Leninist) Liberation. After completing his course in Uttar Pradesh, he returned to Siwan as a party activist. In Siwan, Kushwaha became an activist for farmers' and dalits' rights and stepped in to intervene to assure protection of the rights of Dalits when in 2013 upper caste landlords of the region attempted to attack them with the help from a Bhartiya Janata Party MLA. He was reported to have become a rival of Mohammad Shahabuddin due to his activism. He has been involved in agitations for poor farmers in getting possession of their land.

In 2007, he became the state president of the Revolutionary Youth Association and then its national president in 2010. He was elected to the state committee of the Communist Party of India (Marxist–Leninist) Liberation in 2012. He was also nominated to contest the 2015 Bihar Legislative Assembly election from the Ziradei constituency. Following the nomination, he was arrested in the case of a land dispute and later released in 2016. It was alleged that the arrest had been made on the behest of Mohammad Shahabuddin. During the 2019 Indian general election, Kushwaha worked for the campaign of Amarnath Yadav in the Siwan constituency.

== Criminal accusations ==
He is one of the prime accused in Chilmarwa massacre, which took place in Guthni Police station area of his constituency. In this incident, which happened in 2014, owing to a land dispute, double murder of Raju Singh– son of Mukhiya of Belur village and Umesh Singh– brother of Janata Dal United leader Rakesh Singh were murdered. Kushwaha was arrested along with another CPI-ML Member of Legislative Assembly, Satyadeo Ram and was made an accused of murder under section 302 of Indian Penal Code. While he remained under imprisonment in connection with the murder, Ram got bail after latter's victory in 2015 Bihar Assembly elections. Later, after becoming an MLA in 2020 Bihar Assembly elections, Kushwaha also got bail in the case.

It is reported that this incident happened when homestead land allotted to Dalits were grabbed by landlords and the administration failed to provide the land back to the Dalits. While CPI-ML leaders Satyadeo Ram and Amarjeet Kushwaha intervened to protect the rights of Dalits, the landlords, supported by goons attacked them with the intent to displace the inhabitants. In a confrontation the murders were reported to have happened.
