= Vyas Deo Prasad =

Indian politician

Minister of state for Health & Family Welfare Government of Bihar
- In office 13 April 2008 – 26 November 2010
- Minister: Nand Kishore Yadav
- Chief Minister: Nitish Kumar

Member of Bihar Legislative Assembly
- In office 2005–2020
- Preceded by: Awadh Bihari Choudhary
- Succeeded by: Awadh Bihari Choudhary
- Constituency: Siwan

Personal details
- Party: Bharatiya Janata Party
- Occupation: Politician

Vyas Deo Prasad also known as Vyas Deo Prasad Kushwaha is an Indian politician, former minister of state in the Government of Bihar from April 2008 to November 2010. He represented Siwan in the Bihar Legislative Assembly thrice in a row winning 2005, 2010, 2015 elections. In 2020 Bihar Legislative Assembly election, he was denied a ticket to contest from Siwan in favour of Om Prakash Yadav who lost the election to Awadh Bihari Choudhary.

== Personal life ==
Vyas Deo Prasad hails from Siwan and he belongs to Koeri caste of Bihar. Born to Ambika Prasad, Vyas Deo Prasad completed his BSc from Rajendra College Chapra, Bihar University in the year 1967. He worked as lab demonstrator before entering the active politics. In 2020 Election Affidavit submitted to Election Commission of India, he declared one pending case against him.

In 2018, his son Vikas Kumar was arrested with the possession of liquor along with four of his friends near Uttar Pradesh-Bihar border at Mairwa police station area. This happened due to Bihar's law enforcing complete prohibition on liquor.

== Political career ==
Prasad was born on 30 November 1945 in Siwan. He has six sons and two daughters. After completing his graduation in Science steam, he worked as lab demonstrator for some time and entered into politics in the year 1980. In the same year, he was imprisoned along with many other leaders for opposing the policies of Indira Gandhi led central government. He was incarcerated in Muzaffarpur Central Jail for 15 days. In 1985, he was again imprisoned because of his participation in university movement. He joined Bharatiya Janata Party and contested his first legislative assembly election in 2005. In the election of October 2005, he defeated Awadh Bihari Choudhary, a five term MLA from Siwan Assembly constituency to win his first election. He again defeated Chaudhary in the 2010 legislative assembly elections.

In his second term, he was made a minister in charge of health and family welfare in Government of Bihar under Nitish Kumar. In 2015, he again contested assembly election and defeated Bablu Prasad of Janata Dal (United). Awadh Bihari Chaudhary had contested as independent candidate in this election and finished in third position.

In 2020, he rebelled against BJP as he was denied the symbol to contest the assembly elections. The BJP nominated Om Prakash Yadav, a former parliamentarian from Siwan Lok Sabha constituency to be its candidate. However, later he was placated by BJP leadership and announced his support to Om Prakash Yadav against Awadh Bihari Chaudhary of Rashtriya Janata Dal.

== See also ==
- Niranjan Kumar Mehta
- Avinash Gehlot
- Satyadev Kushwaha
