= Siwan constituency =

Siwan constituency may refer to

- Siwan (Lok Sabha constituency), a parliamentary (Lok Sabha) constituency in Bihar, India.
- Siwan (Vidhan Sabha constituency), a state legislative assembly constituency in Bihar, India.
