= Ramesh Singh Kushwaha =

Indian politician

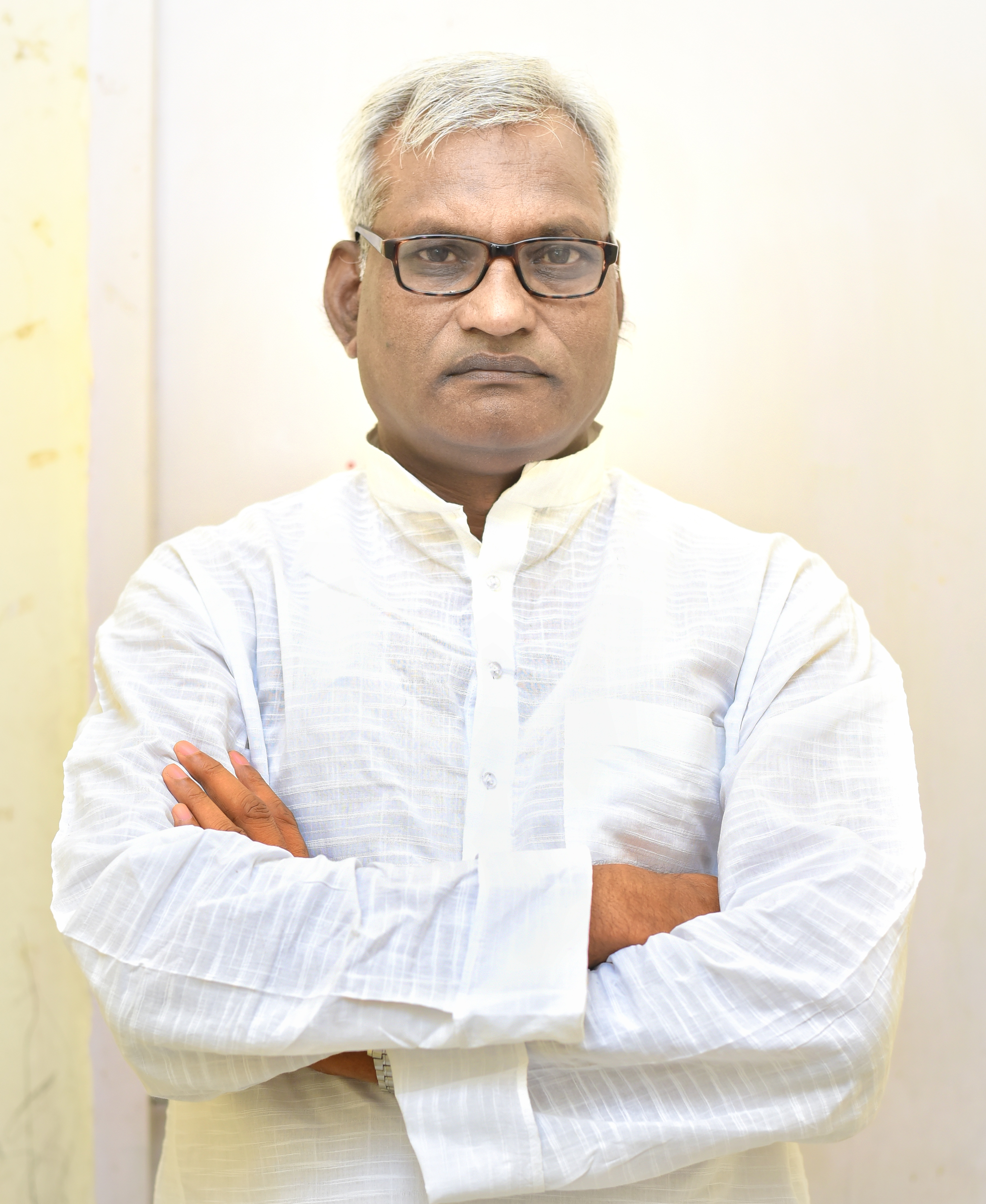

Member of Bihar Legislative Assembly for Ziradei
- In office 8 November 2015 – 10 November 2020
- Preceded by: Asha Devi
- Succeeded by: Amarjeet Kushwaha
- Constituency: Ziradei

Personal details
- Born: 25 January 1962 (age 64) Baraso, Bihar, India
- Party: Janata Dal United
- Other political affiliations: Rashtriya Lok Morcha Communist Party of India (Marxist–Leninist) Liberation
- Spouse: Vijaylakshmi Devi
- Children: Kunal Singh
- As of 13 November, 2020

Ramesh Singh Kushwaha (born 25 January 1962) is an Indian politician. He was the State President of Rashtriya Lok Morcha till March 2024. He is former member Of Bihar Legislative Assembly from 106th Ziradei constituency in Siwan district. In March 2024, he joined Janata Dal (United) along with his wife.

== Political career ==
Kushwaha began his political career in the Communist Party of India (Marxist–Leninist) Liberation. Following the murder of student activist Chandrashekhar Prasad, he filed the FIR against the sitting member of parliament, Mohammad Shahabuddin. He however failed to appear in court to record his statement against the member of parliament. His party members stated that he was pressurised by Shahabuddin and had succumbed to the pressure. In 2000, he expelled from the party for "anti-party" activities.

He joined the Rashtriya Janata Dal after being expelled and worked there till 2003. He became a member of the Rashtriya Lok Samta Party afterwards and then later joined the Janata Dal (United). In 2015, he won the seat of the Ziradei constituency as a candidate of the Janata Dal (United) backed by the Rashtriya Janata Dal. He had contested against his former associate Amarjeet Kushwaha of the Communist Party of India (Marxist–Leninist) Liberation and the sitting member Asha Devi of the Bharatiya Janata Party. In 2020 Bihar Assembly Election Janata Dal (United) denied the ticket to Kushwaha though he was winner in the last election from Ziradei seat on party ticket.

Kushwaha later worked as state president of Rashtriya Lok Morcha, a political party formed by former union minister Upendra Kushwaha. In March 2024, he was re-inducted into Janata Dal United along with his wife Vijay Lakshmi Kushwaha, who was later made a candidate of JDU for Lok Sabha polls from Siwan Lok Sabha constituency.

== Convictions ==
He is prime accused in the murder of Shivji Dubey while he was associated with CPI (ML). In December 2018 chief judicial magistrate of Siwan district summoned him in the 18 year old murder case after he won the 2015 Assembly Election. He surrendered and was sent for 14 day judicial custody.

== See also ==
- Ziradei
- Ziradei (Vidhan Sabha constituency)
- 2015 Bihar Legislative Assembly election
