= Vijaylakshmi Devi =

Member of Indian parliament

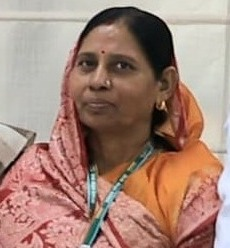

Member of parliament, Lok Sabha
- Incumbent
- Assumed office 4 June 2024
- Preceded by: Kavita Singh (politician)
- Constituency: Siwan Lok Sabha constituency

Personal details
- Born: 17 May 1963 (age 62)
- Party: Janata Dal (United)
- Spouse: Ramesh Singh Kushwaha
- Children: Kunal Singh Kushwaha
- Profession: Politician

Vijaylakshmi Devi also known as Vijay Lakshmi Kushwaha is an Indian politician and a member of Indian Parliament, Lok Sabha from Siwan Lok Sabha constituency. She was elected to the Lok Sabha on the symbol of Janata Dal (United) in 2024 Indian general election. She is married to former JDU legislator, Ramesh Singh Kushwaha, who represented Ziradei Assembly constituency falling within Siwan Lok Sabha constituency.

== Political career ==
She was picked up by Nitish Kumar in 2024, when her husband Ramesh Singh Kushwaha, an erstwhile member of Janata Dal (United) was working with former union minister Upendra Kushwaha as the state chief of latter's Rashtriya Lok Morcha. Kumar inducted both her and her husband into the JDU once again and she was made a candidate for Lok Sabha election, replacing incumbent Kavita Singh.

In her election affidavit, she declares that she is a partner in a company named Kunal constructions.

During her election campaign, it was reported that she might not get the support of a section of Forward Castes in Siwan as her husband was associated with Communist Party of India (Marxist-Leninist) Liberation in the early part of his life and CPI-ML was in conflict with the landed section of Forward Castes in the region. In this tussle, Shahabuddin emerged as their saviour and it was presumed that the Forward Caste will vote for Shahabuddin's wife, Hena Shahab who was contesting as an independent candidate from the constituency in 2024.

Amidst speculation that sitting MP Kavita Singh will also lay claim on the Siwan seat after JDU replaced her to make Vijaylakshmi as their candidate, Singh along with her husband Ajay Singh announced their support in the favor of Vijaylakshmi.

On 4 June 2024, after the final counting of votes, she was declared the winner in the triangular contest involving Awadh Bihari Choudhary and Hena Shahab for Siwan Lok Sabha constituency.

== Personal life ==
She is registered as a voter in Ziradei Assembly constituency of Siwan and belongs to Koeri caste.

== See also ==
- Bharat Singh Kushwah
- Devesh Shakya
- Raja Ram Singh Kushwaha
- Sunil Kumar Kushwaha
- Neeraj Kushwaha Maurya
- Babu Singh Kushwaha
- Abhay Kushwaha
