= Manoj Kumar Singh (Indian politician) =

Indian politician

Manoj Kumar Singh is an Indian politician. He hails from Pratappur Village, Hasainganj thana Siwan district.

== Early life and political background ==
In the early phase of his political career he worked with Mohammad Shahabuddin, albeit he did not become a member of Shahabuddin's Rashtriya Janata Dal. Singh's brother Mrityunjay Singh was killed in 2005, and Shahabuddin was later charged with involvement in the murder.

== Political career ==
Singh was the chairman of Siwan Central Co-operative Bank from 2006 to 2017. Singh joined the Bharatiya Janata Party in 2008. He became Siwan District president of BJP. In 2009 he was thrown out of the BJP, as he had supported independent candidate Om Prakash Yadav for the Siwan seat in the 2009 Indian general election.

He was elected as an independent to the Bihar Legislative Council in 2009. Singh rejoined the BJP on 13 September 2010.

Singh joined the Janata Dal (United) on 14 March 2014. JD(U) fielded him as its candidate for the Siwan seat in the 2014 Indian general election.

== Electoral history ==
In 2015, Singh contested Bihar Assembly election from Raghunathpur vidhan sabha seat, backed by BJP, and secured total of 50,297 votes.

In 2020, Singh contested from 108, Raghunathpur vidhan sabha seat and was backed by LJP. He secured a total of 49,792 votes.
