= Satyadeo Ram =

Indian politician from Bihar

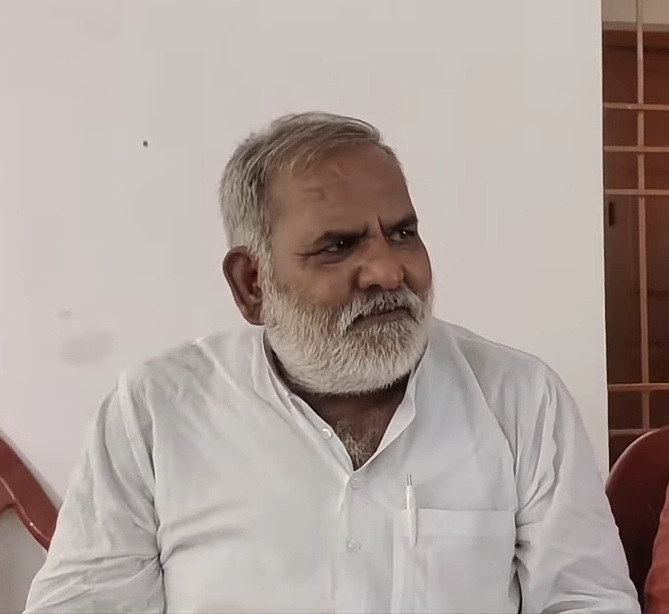

Member of Bihar Legislative Assembly
- In office November 2015 – 2025
- Preceded by: Ramayan Manjhi
- Succeeded by: Vishnu Deo Paswan
- Constituency: Darauli
- In office October 1995 – October 2005
- Preceded by: Gorakh Ram
- Succeeded by: Ramayan Manjhi
- Constituency: Mairwa

Personal details
- Born: 2 February 1964 (age 62) Krishnapali, Siwan, Bihar
- Party: Communist Party of India (Marxist-Leninist) Liberation
- Spouse: Malti Devi
- Children: Raginee; Chandrashekhar; Chhotu
- Education: Shyam Lal Jain Uchha Vidyalaya, Darauli
- Occupation: Agriculturalist; politician; social worker

Satyadeo Ram (alternatively Satyadev Ram; born 2 February 1964) is an Indian politician and member of Bihar Legislative Assembly. In the Bihar Legislative Assembly Election, 2015, he was elected from Darauli constituency, by defeating Ramayan Manjhi (BJP), a two-time MLA, by a margin of about 10,000 votes. He is one of the prominent leaders of Communist Party of India (Marxist–Leninist) (Liberation) from Siwan district, others being former MLA Amarnath Yadav and Amarjeet Kushwaha.

== Early life ==
Satyadev Ram was born in Krishnapali village of Darauli Block of Siwan district of Bihar in a Dalit family. His father, the late Rajbanshi Ram, was a farmer. He graduated from 'Shyam Lal Jain Uchha Vidyalaya, Darauli' in 1982. He worked as an agriculturist and social worker.

== Career ==
He joined the Communist Party of India (Marxist–Leninist) (Liberation).

Year	Constituency	Result	Margin of Votes	Primary rival and Party
2015	Darauli (SC)	Won	9584	Ramayan Manjhi (BJP)
2010	Darauli (SC)	Lost	7006	Ramayan Manjhi (BJP)
2005	Mairwa (SC)	Lost	380	Ramayan Manjhi (BJP)
2000	Mairwa (SC)	Won	6509	Gorakh Ram (INC)
1995	Mairwa (SC)	Won	1203	Girdhari Ram (CPM)

He contested from Gopalganj constituency in the 2009 Indian general election but was defeated.

== Personal life ==
He married Malti Devi, another social worker and a political leader and Mukhiya of her Gram Panchayat. The couple has a daughter, Gudiya and two sons, Chandrashekhar and Chhotu.
