= Bachcha Pandey =

Indian politician

Bachcha Pandey (born 25 March 1971) is an Indian politician from Bihar. He is an MLA from Barharia Assembly constituency in Siwan district. He won the 2020 Bihar Legislative Assembly election representing the Rashtriya Janata Dal.

== Early life and education ==
Pandey is from Darauli, Siwan district, Bihar. He is the son of late Radheshyam Pandey. He completed his Class 10 at Dronacharya High School, Darauli, in 1986 and later discontinued his studies. He is a contractor.

== Career ==
Pandey won from Barharia Assembly constituency representing Rashtriya Janata Dal in the 2020 Bihar Legislative Assembly election. He polled 71,793 votes and defeated his nearest rival, Shyam Bahadur Singh of Janata Dal (United), by a margin of 3,559 votes.
