= Siddarth Patel =

Indian politician

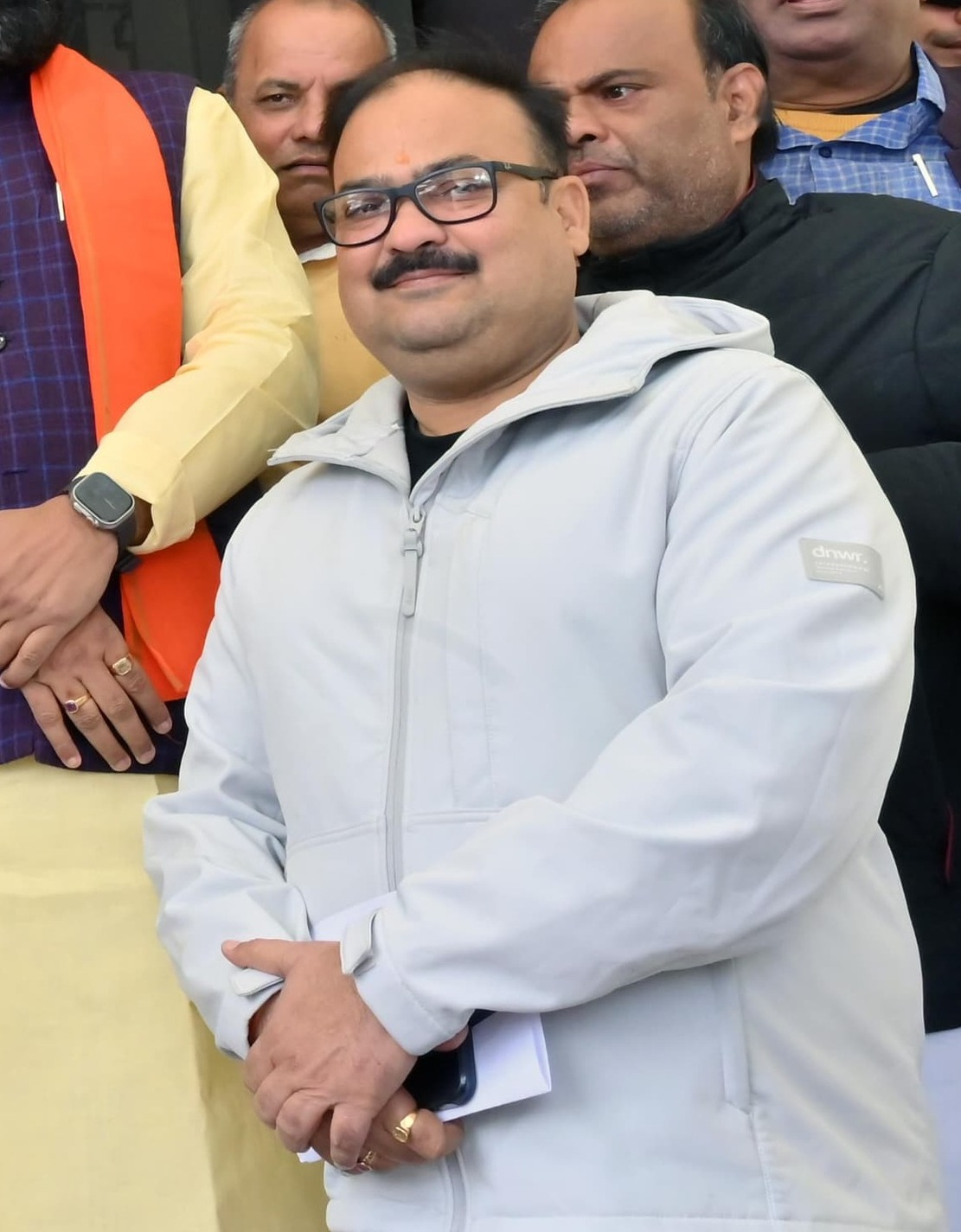

Member of Bihar Legislative Assembly
- Incumbent
- Assumed office 2020
- Preceded by: Raj Kishore Singh
- Constituency: Vaishali

Personal details
- Party: Janata Dal (United)
- Profession: Politician

Siddarth Patel is an Indian politician from Bihar. He is a two term member of Bihar Legislative Assembly from Vaishali Assembly constituency and a member of Janata Dal (United) political party led by Bihar Chief Minister Nitish Kumar. He won the 2025 Bihar Legislative Assembly elections by defeating Ajay Kushwaha of Rashtriya Janata Dal with a margin of over 32,000 votes.

== Personal life ==
Patel is from Vaishali district's prominent political family, which dominated the politics of the district for decades ever since India got its independence. The Patel family and Shahi family, which are considered political rivals, have given a number of legislators for the district. Patel himself belongs to lineage of Indian freedom struggle activist Guljar Patel. Brishin Patel, son of Guljar Patel and a legislator from Vaishali district, who won the Vaishali Assembly constituency elections for the first time in 1980 is the uncle of Siddarth Patel.

== Political career ==
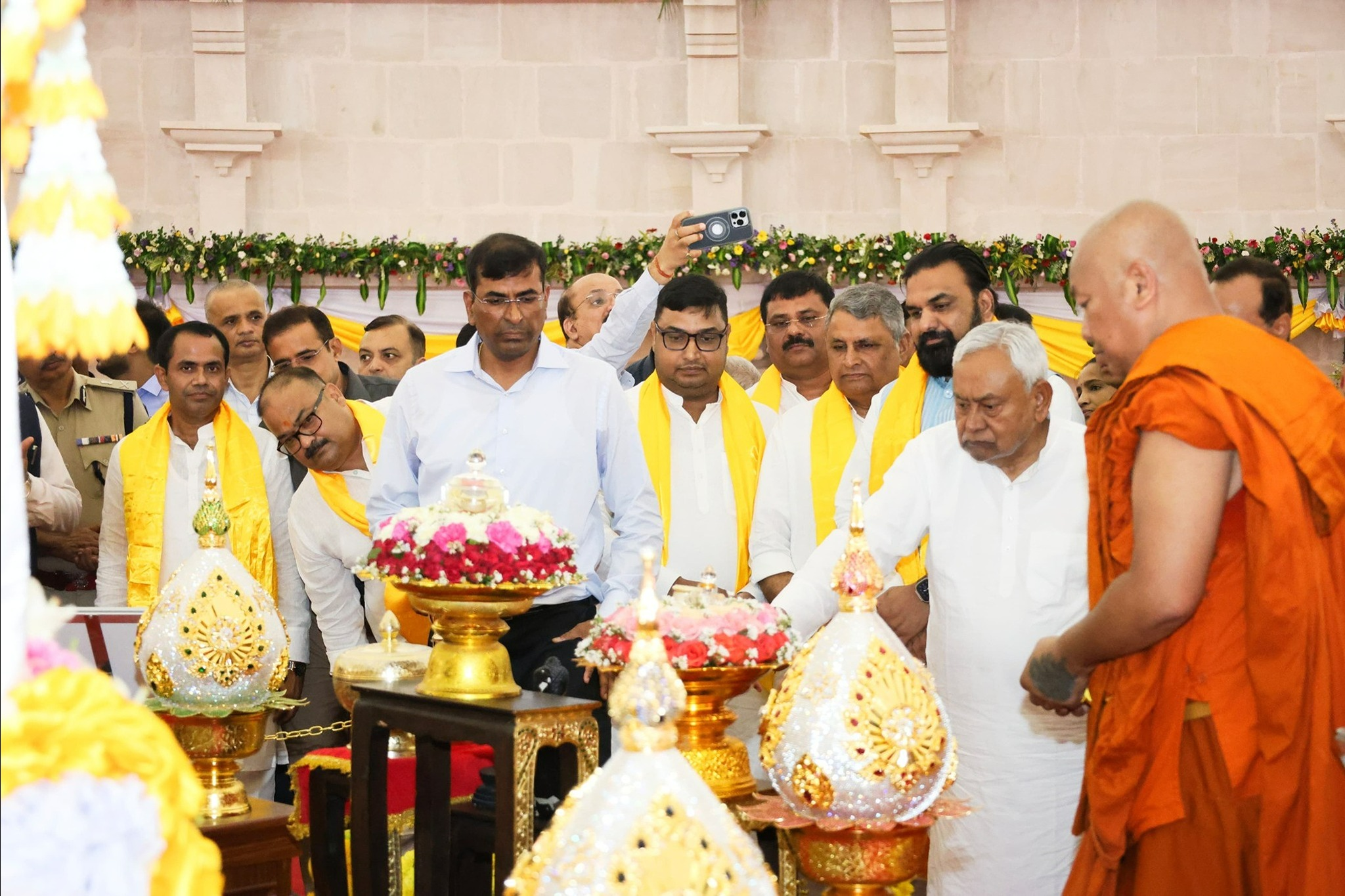
Siddarth Patel with Nitish Kumar, Samrat Chaudhary, Jayant Raj Kushwaha, Umesh Singh Kushwaha and others inaugurating Budhha Samyak Darshan Museum and Memorial Stupa in Vaishali.

Patel won Bihar Legislative Assembly elections of 2020 from Vaishali Assembly constituency and became an MLA for the first time.In 2025, while he was made candidate of Janata Dal (United) from the same constituency against Rashtriya Janata Dal's Ajay Kushwaha, his uncle Brishin Patel, a six time MLA, announced that he will contest as independent candidate from same constituency for the assembly elections against his nephew as per demand of his supporters.

However, Patel registered victory defeating both RJD's Ajay Kushwaha and his uncle Brishin Patel in 2025. Thus, becoming an MLA for the second time.
