= Raghunathpur Assembly constituency =

Raghunathpur Assembly constituency may refer to:

- Raghunathpur, Bihar Assembly constituency
- Raghunathpur, West Bengal Assembly constituency
