= Mairwa Assembly constituency =

Former constituency of the Bihar legislative assembly in India

Coordinates: 26°14′N 84°09′E

Mairwa
- Former constituency for the Bihar Legislative Assembly

Constituency details
- Country: India
- Region: East India
- State: Bihar
- District: Siwan
- Established: 1957
- Abolished: 2008

Mairwa Assembly constituency was an assembly constituency in Siwan district in the Indian state of Bihar. It was reserved for scheduled castes.

== Overview ==
It was part of Siwan Lok Sabha constituency.

As a consequence of the orders of the Delimitation Commission of India, Mairwa Assembly constituency ceased to exist in 2010.

== Members of Legislative Assembly ==
| Year | Member | Party |
|---|---|---|
| 1957 | Ram Basawan Ram | Indian National Congress |
| 1962 | Ram Basawan Ram | Indian National Congress |
| 1967 | Giridhari Ram | Communist Party of India (Marxist) |
| 1969 | Ram Basawan Ram | Indian National Congress |
| 1970^ | Ramawatar Ram | Bharatiya Jana Sangh |
| 1972 | Ram Narain Ram | Indian National Congress |
| 1977 | Phulchand Ram | Janata Party |
| 1980 | Ram Narain Ram | Indian National Congress (I) |
| 1985 | Gorakh Ram | Indian National Congress |
| 1990 | Gorakh Ram | Indian National Congress |
| 1995 | Satyadeo Ram | Communist Party of India (Marxist–Leninist) Liberation |
| 2000 | Satyadeo Ram | Communist Party of India (Marxist–Leninist) Liberation |
| 2005 | Satyadeo Ram | Communist Party of India (Marxist–Leninist) Liberation |
| 2005 | Ramayan Manjhi | Bharatiya Janata Party |
2010 onwards: Constituency does not exist
