= Daraunda Assembly constituency =

Coordinates: 26°03′31″N 84°26′24″E

Daraunda
- Constituency No. - for the Bihar Legislative Assembly

Constituency details
- Country: India
- Region: East India
- State: Bihar
- District: Siwan
- Lok Sabha constituency: Siwan
- Established: 2008
- Total electors: 315,729

Member of Legislative Assembly
- 18th Bihar Legislative Assembly
- Incumbent Karanjeet alias Vyas Singh
- Party: BJP
- Alliance: NDA
- Elected year: 2025
- Preceded by: Kavita Singh JD(U)

Daraunda Assembly constituency is an assembly constituency in Siwan district in the Indian state of Bihar.

== Overview ==
As per Delimitation of Parliamentary and Assembly constituencies Order, 2008, No. 109 Daraunda Assembly constituency is composed of the following: Daraunda and Siswan community development blocks; Phalpura, Laheji, Mandrauli, Mandarapali, Sahuli, Telkhthu, Hasanpura, Pakadi, Rajanpura and Harpur Kotwa gram panchayats of Hasanpura CD Block.

Daraunda Assembly constituency is part of No. 18 Siwan (Lok Sabha constituency).

== Members of the Legislative Assembly ==
Year	Member	Party
Until 2008: Constituency did not exist
2010	Jagmato Devi	Janata Dal (United)
2011^	Kavita Singh	Janata Dal (United)
2015	Kavita Singh	Janata Dal (United)
2019^	Karanjeet alias Vyas Singh	Independent
2020	Karanjeet alias Vyas Singh	Bharatiya Janata Party
2025	Karanjeet alias Vyas Singh	Bharatiya Janata Party

^by-election

== Election results ==
=== 2025 ===
Bihar Assembly election, 2020:Daraundha constituency
Party	Candidate	Votes	%	±%
BJP	Karanjeet Singh	87,047	47.02	+2.93
CPI(ML)L	Amarnath Yadav	68,680	37.1	−0.05
Independent	Gudiya Devi	11,133	6.01	
JSP	Satyandra Yadav	6,731	3.64	
Independent	Balendra Kumar Ray	2,976	1.61	
BSP	Madhusudan Singh	2,250	1.22	
NOTA	None of the above	5,151	2.78	−0.57
Majority		18,367	9.92	+2.98
Turnout		185,136	58.64	+7.53
BJP gain from		Swing		

=== 2020 ===
Bihar Assembly election, 2020: Daraundha constituency
Party	Candidate	Votes	%	±%
BJP	Karanjeet Singh	71,934	44.09	+9.14
CPI(ML)L	Amarnath Yadav	60,614	37.15	
Independent	Rohit Kumar Anurag Alias Bhola Ji	10,299	6.31	
Independent	Laichi Bansafor	3,676	2.25	
JAP(L)	Shailendra Kumar Yadav	3,453	2.12	
Independent	Kaushlendra Singh Alias K.K. Singh	3,004	1.84	
Jai Maha Bharath Party	Anand Kumar Singh	2,019	1.24	
NOTA	None of the above	5,458	3.35	−2.57
Majority		11,320	6.94	−1.78
Turnout		163,163	51.11	−1.34
BJP gain from Independent		Swing		

=== 2019 ===
2019 Bihar Assembly By-elections: Daraundha constituency
Party	Candidate	Votes	%	±%
Independent	Karanjeet Singh	51,223		
JD(U)	Ajay Kumar Singh	23,944		
RJD	Umesh Kumar Singh	20,911		
Turnout		140,328		
Registered electors		318,460		
Independent gain from JD(U)		Swing		

In the 2019 elections and in the 2011 by election necessitated by the death of the sitting MLA, Jagmato Devi, Kavita Singh of JD(U) defeated Parameshwar Singh of RJD. In the 2019 elections and in the 2011 by election necessitated by the death of the sitting MLA, Jagmato Devi, Kavita Singh of JD(U) defeated Parameshwar Singh of RJD.

=== 2015 ===
In the 2015 state assembly election BJP Candidate Jitendra Swami, Jitendra Swami (NDA) Alliance Social Leader Jitendra Swami participated in Daraundha assembly.

2015 Bihar Legislative Assembly election: Daraundha constituency
Party	Candidate	Votes	%	±%
JD(U)	Kavita Singh	66,255	43.67	
BJP	Jitendra Swami	53,033	34.95	
NOTA	n/a	8,983	5.92	
Independent	Shailendra Kumar Yadav	6,712	4.42	
BSP	Ganesh Ram	4,001	2.64	
Independent	Deepak Kumar Mishra	2,958	1.95	
CPI(ML)L	Jayshankar Pandit	2,681	1.77	
Independent	Kavita Devi (Pakwaliya)	1,536	1.01	
Independent	Jay Prakash Yadav	1,484	0.98	
NOTA	None of the above	8,983	5.92	
Majority		13,222	8.72	
Turnout		151,722	52.45	
JD(U) hold		Swing		
