= Laliteshwar Prasad Shahi =

Indian politician

Babu Shri Laliteshwar Prasad Shahi (1 October 1920 – 9 June 2018) was an Indian politician of Indian National Congress from Bihar. He was born on 1 October 1920 to Yogendra Prasad Shahi and his wife. He had three brothers, Nanki Prasad Shahi, Bhuvneshwar Prasad Shahi and Vijeshwar Prasad Shahi. He has a known grandson named Santoshi Kumar. He was arrested during the 1942 Quit India Movement on 11.09.42 at Lalgunj in Vaishali (then Muzaffarpur) District. He was produced before S.D.O. Hajipur on 12.09.42 and sentenced to 3 years Rigorous Imprisonment under Section 56 D.I.R. On an appeal filed by a co-convict, he was released in August 1943 after 11 months in jail. He was the Member of the Legislative Assembly between 1980 and 1985 from Lalganj, Vaishali, defeating Jai Narain Prasad Nishad. In 1984, he became Member of Parliament from Muzaffarpur and became the Education & Culture Minister in the Indian Government. His son Hemant Kumar Shahi was Member of Legislative Assembly from Vaishali. His daughter-in-law Veena Shahi is a former MLA and co-operative minister of Bihar. Shahi died on 9 June 2018 after a prolonged illness.
