= Darauli Assembly constituency =

Constituency of the Bihar legislative assembly in India

- Constituency No. - for the Bihar Legislative Assembly

Constituency details
- Country: India
- Region: East India
- State: Bihar
- District: Siwan
- Established: 1951
- Total electors: 308,041

Member of Legislative Assembly
- 18th Bihar Legislative Assembly
- Incumbent Vishnu Deo Paswan
- Party: LJP(RV)
- Alliance: NDA
- Elected year: 2025

Darauli (Vidhan Sabha constituency) is a Legislative Assembly constituency in Siwan district in the Indian state of Bihar. It has reserved for scheduled castes since 2010. Before 2010, it was an open seat (unreserved). The current MLA of this Legislative Assembly constituency is Satyadeo Ram.

== Overview ==
As per Delimitation of Parliamentary and Assembly constituencies Order, 2008, No. 107 Darauli (Vidhan Sabha constituency) (SC) is composed of the following: Darauli, Guthani and Andar community development blocks.

Darauli Assembly constituency is part of No. 18 Siwan (Lok Sabha constituency).

== Members of the Legislative Assembly ==
Year	Name	Party
1952	Ramayan Shukla	Indian National Congress
1957	Basawan Ram	Indian National Congress
1957	Rajendra Prasad Singh	Janata Party
1962	Ramayan Shukla	Indian National Congress
1967	Krishna Pratap Singh	Bharatiya Jana Sangh
1969	Lakshman Raut	Samyukta Socialist Party
1972	Krishna Pratap Singh	Bharatiya Jana Sangh
1977	Krishna Pratap Singh	Indian National Congress
1980	Chandrika Pandey	Indian National Congress (I)
1985	Shiv Shankar Yadav	Lokdal
1990	Shiv Shankar Yadav	Janata Dal
1995	Amar Nath Yadav	Communist Party of India (Marxist–Leninist) Liberation
2000	Shiv Shanker Yadav	Rashtriya Janata Dal
2005	Amar Nath Yadav	Communist Party of India (Marxist–Leninist) Liberation
2005	Amar Nath Yadav	Communist Party of India (Marxist–Leninist) Liberation
2010	Ramayan Manjhi	Bharatiya Janata Party
2015	Satyadeo Ram	Communist Party of India (Marxist–Leninist) Liberation
2020	Satyadeo Ram	Communist Party of India (Marxist–Leninist) Liberation
2025	Vishnu Deo Paswan	Lok Janshakti Party (Ram Vilas)

== Election results ==
=== 2025 ===
Bihar Assembly election, 2025: Darauli
Party	Candidate	Votes	%	±%
LJP(RV)	Vishnu Deo	83,014	47.38	
CPI(ML)L	Satyadeo Ram	73,442	41.92	−8.58
JSP	Ganesh Ram	4,630	2.64	
SBSP	Manoj Ram	3,908	2.23	
BSP	Harilal Ram	3,208	1.83	
Independent	Pradeep Manjhi	2,465	1.41	
NOTA	None of the above	4,546	2.59	−0.44
Majority		9,572	5.46	−2.09
Turnout		175,213	56.88	+6.72
LJP(RV) gain from CPI(ML)L		Swing		

=== 2020 ===
Bihar Assembly election, 2020: Darauli
Party	Candidate	Votes	%	±%
CPI(ML)L	Satyadeo Ram	81,067	50.5	
BJP	Ramayan Manjhi	68,948	42.95	+15.88
Independent	Sheo Kumar Manjhi	3,140	1.96	
The Plurals Party	Kumar Shashi Ranjan	2,521	1.57	
NOTA	None of the above	4,863	3.03	−0.1
Majority		12,119	7.55	+1.07
Turnout		160,539	50.16	−1.1
CPI(ML)L hold		Swing		

=== 2015 ===
2015 Bihar Legislative Assembly election: Darauli
Party	Candidate	Votes	%	±%
CPI(ML)L	Satyadeo Ram	49,576	33.55	
BJP	Ramayan Manjhi	39,992	27.07	
RJD	Parmatma Ram	37,345	25.27	
Independent	Chandrama Prasad	8,760	5.93	
Independent	Mira Devi	2,593	1.75	
BSP	Bimalesh Kumar Ram	1,697	1.15	
JKNPP	Manoj Ram	1,617	1.09	
SwSP	Ram Ek Bal Baitha	1,564	1.06	
NOTA	None of the above	4,618	3.13	
Majority		9,584	6.48	
Turnout		147,762	51.26	
