= Raghunathpur, Bihar Assembly constituency =

Coordinates: 26°00′20″N 84°15′34″E

Raghunathpur, Bihar
- Constituency No. - for the Bihar Legislative Assembly

Constituency details
- Country: India
- Region: East India
- State: Bihar
- District: Siwan
- Established: 1951
- Total electors: 294,703

Member of Legislative Assembly
- 18th Bihar Legislative Assembly
- Incumbent Osama Shahab
- Party: RJD
- Alliance: MGB
- Elected year: 2025

Raghunathpur Assembly constituency is an assembly constituency in Siwan district in the Indian state of Bihar.

== Overview ==
As per Delimitation of Parliamentary and Assembly constituencies Order, 2008, No. 108 Raghunathpur Assembly constituency is composed of the following: Raghunathpur and Hussainganj community development blocks; Shekpura, Piyaur, Aranda, Gayghat and Usari Bujurg gram panchayats of Hasanpura CD Block.

Raghunathpur Assembly constituency is part of No. 18 Siwan (Lok Sabha constituency) . Raghunathpur consists of village's like Rajpur, Kausar, Murarpatti, Mathia, Semaria, Narakatia, Khap banakat, Narhan, Adampur, Lagusa, Nikhti, Jhakhara etc.

== Member of legislative Assembly ==
Year	Name	Party
1952	Ram Nandan Yadav	Indian National Congress
1957	Ramdev Sinha	Praja Socialist Party
1962	Ram Nandan Yadav	Indian National Congress
1967	Ramdev Sinha	Samyukta Socialist Party
1969	Ram Nandan Yadav	Indian National Congress
1972	Shreenivas Singh	Indian National Congress
1977	Vikram Kunwar	Janata Party
1980	Vijay Shanker Dubey	Indian National Congress
1985	Vijay Shanker Dubey	Indian National Congress
1990	Vijay Shanker Dubey	Indian National Congress
1995	Vikram Kunwar	Janata Dal
2000	Vijay Shanker Dubey	Indian National Congress
2005	Jagmato Devi	Independent politician
2005	Jagmato Devi	Janata Dal (United)
2010	Vikram Kunwar	Bharatiya Janata Party
2015	Hari Shankar Yadav	Rashtriya Janata Dal
2020	Hari Shankar Yadav	Rashtriya Janata Dal
2025	Osama Shahab	Rashtriya Janata Dal

== Election results ==
=== 2025 ===
2025 Bihar Legislative Assembly election: Raghunathpur
Party	Candidate	Votes	%	±%
RJD	Osama Shahab	88,278	48.81	+6.15
JD(U)	Vikash Kumar Singh	79,030	43.69	+27.22
JSP	Rahul Kirti	3,071	1.7	
Independent	Upendra Singh	2,909	1.61	
SBSP	Kumar Santosh	2,195	1.21	
NOTA	None of the above	3,478	1.92	−1.01
Majority		9,248	5.12	−6.19
Turnout		180,874	61.38	+7.86
RJD hold		Swing		

=== 2020 ===
2020 Bihar Legislative Assembly election: Raghunathpur
Party	Candidate	Votes	%	±%
RJD	Hari Shankar Yadav	67,757	42.66	+0.68
LJP	Manoj Kumar Singh	49,792	31.35	
JD(U)	Rajeshwar Chouhan	26,162	16.47	
BSP	Vinay Kumar Pandey	5,295	3.33	+2.04
SDPI	Mohamad Kaif Samsir	5,179	3.26	
NOTA	None of the above	4,655	2.93	+0.02
Majority		17,965	11.31	+4.0
Turnout		158,840	53.52	−1.21
RJD hold		Swing		

=== 2015 ===
2015 Bihar Legislative Assembly election: Raghunathpur
Party	Candidate	Votes	%	±%
RJD	Hari Shankar Yadav	61,042	41.98	
BJP	Manoj Kumar Singh	50,420	34.67	
CPI(ML)L	Amarnath Yadav	16,714	11.49	
Independent	Rajesh Kumar Tiwari	2,744	1.89	
Independent	Vishwakarma Bhagat	2,191	1.51	
BSP	Parwar Alam	1,881	1.29	
Independent	Prem Sagar Pandey	1,799	1.24	
SP	Md. Chand	1,656	1.14	
NOTA	None of the above	4,227	2.91	
Majority		10,622	7.31	
Turnout		145,413	54.73	
