= Veena Shahi =

Indian politician

Member of Bihar Legislative Assembly
- In office 2000–2005
- Preceded by: Raj Kishore Singh
- Succeeded by: Brishin Patel
- Constituency: Vaishali
- In office 1992–1995
- Preceded by: Hemant Kumar Shahi
- Succeeded by: Raj Kishore Singh
- Constituency: Vaishali

Personal details
- Born: 5 January 1953 (age 73) Sitamarhi, India
- Party: Indian National Congress (since 2020),(1992-2009)
- Other political affiliations: Bharatiya Janata Party (2014-2020); Rashtriya Janata Dal (2010–2014); Janata Dal (United) (2009-2010)
- Spouse: Late Hemant Kumar Shahi
- Relations: Laliteshwar Prasad Shahi (father-in-law)
- Education: Patna Women's College (BA)

Veena Shahi is an Indian politician. She defeated Brishin Patel of Janata Dal (United), or JD(U), in 2000 in the Bihar Legislative Assembly election at Vaishali. She was also the Co-Operative minister in Third Rabri Devi ministry. She is the widow of Hemant Kumar Shahi (son of veteran Indian National Congress party leader Laliteshwar Prasad Shahi).

== Life ==
Veena Shahi was born on 5 January 1953, in Sitamarhi, India. She was born into the Mahant family of Sitamarhi as the eldest daughter of the Late Mahant Raghunath Das and the Late Saraswati Devi. Shahi completed her schooling at Mount Carmel School, Patna, where she excelled in academics and extracurricular activities. She later graduated with a B.A. Honors in Political Science from Patna Women's College.

Shahi married Hemant Shahi, son of Congress leader Late Laliteshwar Prasad Shahi, in 1977. The couple started a successful bus company in 1982, which went on to become one of the biggest bus companies in Bihar, Shahi Tirupati.

In March 1992, Shahi's husband Hemant was assassinated. After her husband's assassination, she won the by-election to replace him. In the 2000 Bihar Legislative Assembly election, Shahi contested and won the MLA election from Vaishali, Bihar, on a Congress ticket.

Shahi has a daughter named Vidisha Shahi.
