= Barharia Assembly constituency =

Coordinates: 26°18′13″N 84°27′11″E

Barharia
- Constituency No. - for the Bihar Legislative Assembly

Constituency details
- Country: India
- Region: East India
- State: Bihar
- Established: 1951
- Total electors: 310,094

Member of Legislative Assembly
- 18th Bihar Legislative Assembly
- Incumbent Indradev Patel
- Party: JD(U)
- Alliance: NDA
- Elected year: 2025

Barharia Assembly constituency is an assembly constituency in Siwan district in the Indian state of Bihar.

== Overview ==
As per the Delimitation of Parliamentary and Assembly constituencies Order, 2008, No. 110 Barharia Assembly constituency is composed of the following: Pachrukhi community development block; Tarwara, Kunwa, Rasulpur, Padrauna Khurd, Habibpur ,Koirigawa, Balapur, Madhopur, Barasara, Barharia, Sadarpur, Tetahli, Nawalpur, Bahuara Kadir, Bahadurpur, Hardobara, Bhamopali, Rachhopali, Rampur, Bhopatpur, Sikandarpur, Bhaluara, Hariharpurlalgarh, Chaukhi Hasan and Dindayalpur gram panchayats of Barharia CD Block.

Barharia Assembly constituency is part of No. 18 Siwan (Lok Sabha constituency). Habibpur is also a big village in barharia constituency.

== Members of the Legislative Assembly ==
Year	Name	Party
1952	Saghirul Haque	Indian National Congress
1952^	B. P. Singh	Indian National Congress
1957	Quamrul Haque	Indian National Congress
1962	Ram Raj Singh	Praja Socialist Party
1967	Abdul Jalil	Communist Party of India
1969	Ram Raj Singh	Bharatiya Jana Sangh
1972	Abdul Jalil	Communist Party of India
1977-2010: Constituency did not exist
2010	Shyam Bahadur Singh	Janata Dal (United)
2015	Shyam Bahadur Singh	Janata Dal (United)
2020	Bachcha Pandey	Rashtriya Janata Dal
2025	Indradev Singh	Janata Dal (United)

== Election results ==
=== 2025 ===
2025 Bihar Legislative Assembly election: Barharia
Party	Candidate	Votes	%	±%
JD(U)	Indradev Singh	93,600	47.51	▲7.96
RJD	Arun Kumar Gupta	81,464	41.35	▼0.27
Independent	Shyam Bahadur Singh	4,692	2.38	
JSP	Shekh Shahnawz Alam	3,750	1.9	
Independent	Hareram Singh	3,229	1.64	
AAP	Jitendra Yadav	2,175	1.1	
NOTA	None of the above	3,932	2.0	▼0.45
Majority		12,136	6.16	▲4.09
Turnout		196,995	63.53	▲6.39
JD(U) gain from RJD		Swing		

=== 2020 ===
2020 Bihar Legislative Assembly election: Barharia
Party	Candidate	Votes	%	±%
RJD	Bachcha Pandey	71,793	41.62	
JD(U)	Shyam Bahadur Singh	68,234	39.55	−2.38
LJP	Birbahadur Singh	5,065	2.94	−29.61
RLSP	Bandana Devi	4,837	2.8	
Independent	Muzaffer Imam	3,312	1.92	
Independent	Ranjeet Kumar Singh	3,005	1.74	
Independent	Dr. Ashraf Ali	2,710	1.57	
Independent	Rizwan Ahmad	2,699	1.56	
Independent	Anil Kumar Giri	1,597	0.93	
NOTA	None of the above	4,231	2.45	+0.6
Majority		3,559	2.07	−7.31
Turnout		172,508	57.14	+0.15
RJD gain from JD(U)		Swing		

=== 2015 ===
2015 Bihar Legislative Assembly election: Barharia
Party	Candidate	Votes	%	±%
JD(U)	Shyam Bahadur Singh	65,168	41.93	
LJP	Bachha Pandey	50,585	32.55	
Independent	Mantu Kumar	7,258	4.67	
Independent	Mahadeo Paswan	6,022	3.88	
Independent	Lalasa Devi	5,340	3.44	
CPI	Irfan Ahmed	3,107	2.0	
BSP	Dhananjay Kumar Singh	2,481	1.6	
Independent	Dhananjay Pandey	2,351	1.51	
Independent	Niraj Kr. Tiwari	2,060	1.33	
JAP(L)	Rijwan Ahmad	2,014	1.3	
Bhartiya New Sanskar Krantikari Party	Abdul Gafar Ansari	1,613	1.04	
Independent	Umesh Kumar Singh	1,446	0.93	
NOTA	None of the above	2,871	1.85	
Majority		14,583	9.38	
Turnout		155,404	56.99	
Bhartiya New Sanskar Krantikari Party	Abdul Gafar Ansari	1,613	1.04	
