= Janardan Tiwari =

Indian politician (1927–2006)

Member of Parliament, Lok Sabha
- In office 1989–1991
- Preceded by: Abdul Ghafoor
- Succeeded by: Brishin Patel
- Constituency: Siwan

Member of Bihar Legislative Assembly
- In office 1980–1985
- Preceded by: Ghulam Sarwar
- Succeeded by: Awadh Bihari Choudhary
- Constituency: Siwan
- In office 1969–1977
- Preceded by: Raja Ram Chaudhry
- Succeeded by: Ghulam Sarwar
- Constituency: Siwan
- In office 1962–1967
- Preceded by: S. Devi
- Succeeded by: Raja Ram Chaudhry
- Constituency: Siwan

Personal details
- Born: 25 December 1927
- Died: 19 April 2006 (aged 78) Bindusar, Siwan, Bihar, India
- Party: Bharatiya Janata Party

Janardan Tiwari (25 December 1927 – 19 April 2006) was an Indian politician. He was elected to the Lok Sabha, the lower house of the Parliament of India from Siwan in Bihar as a member of the Bharatiya Janata Party. Tiwari died in Siwan, Bihar on 19 April 2006, at the age of 78.
