= Ram Nandan Yadav =

Indian politician

MLA, Bihar Legislative Assembly
- In office 1952–1957
- Preceded by: position established
- Succeeded by: Ramdev Sinha
- Constituency: Raghunathpur
- In office 1962–1967
- Preceded by: Ramdev Sinha
- Succeeded by: Ramdev Sinha
- Constituency: Raghunathpur
- In office 1969–1972
- Preceded by: Ramdev Sinha
- Succeeded by: Shreenivas Singh
- Constituency: Raghunathpur

Personal details
- Born: Raghunathpur,Siwan, Bengal Presidency (Now in Bihar)
- Died: Siwan, Bihar
- Party: Indian National Congress
- Occupation: Politician

Ram Nandan Yadav was an Indian politician. He was elected as a member of Bihar Legislative Assembly from the Raghunathpur constituency in Siwan, Bihar.
