= Indradev Singh =

Indian politician from Bihar

Indradev Singh is an Indian politician from Bihar affiliated with the Janata Dal (United) (JD(U)). He represents the Barharia Assembly constituency (constituency number 110) in the Bihar Legislative Assembly.

== Early life and education ==
According to his 2025 election affidavit, Singh was 60 years old at the time of filing his nomination. He completed his matriculation from Deendaalpur High School in Siwan, Bihar, in 1982. His declared profession is agriculture and business.

== Political career ==
=== 2025 Bihar Legislative Assembly election ===
Singh contested the 2025 Bihar Legislative Assembly election from the Barharia constituency as a candidate of the Janata Dal (United). He won the election, receiving 93,600 votes and defeating his nearest rival, Arun Kumar Gupta of the Rashtriya Janata Dal, who received 81,464 votes. Singh won by a margin of 12,136 votes.

Following his election, he became the MLA representing Barharia in the Bihar Legislative Assembly. His term began on 14 November 2025.
