= Goraul =

Community development block in Vaishali district, Bihar, India

- Community development block
- Location in Bihar, India Goraul (India)
- Coordinates: 25.922°N 85.324°E
- Country: India
- State: Bihar
- Region: Mithila
- District: Vaishali

Government
  - Type: Community development block
- Elevation: 55 m (180 ft)

Population (2001)
  - Total: 27,327

Languages
  - Official: Vajjika, Maithili, Hindi
- Time zone: UTC+5:30 (IST)
- ISO 3166 code: IN-BR
- Lok Sabha constituency: Vaishali
- Vidhan Sabha constituency: Vaishali
- Website: vaishali.bih.nic.in

Goraul is a community development block in Vaishali district in the state of Bihar, India.

== History ==
Goraul is very close to Vaishali garh, Vaishali or Vesali (in Pali), which was a city, the capital of the Licchavis and the Vajjian Confederacy. Goraul is very close to villages such as Goraul Bhagwanpur, Dhane Goraul, Byaschak nickname Chakvayas and Mohanpur Asli.

== Economy ==
Goraul Sugar Mill was one of the most productive sugar mills in this area once upon a time. The adjoining catchment area used to grow huge amount of sugarcane. The sugar mill has shut down since. The agriculture land use pattern has shifted from sugarcane to other cash crops like tobacco and traditional food crops and vegetables.

Goraul has immense potential as a centre for horticulture and agro-processing (fruit pulp) industries. The entire region is dotted with plantations of

1) Mango - delicious local varieties which are increasingly getting lost in targeted marketing campaigns of alphonso and dussehri

2) Lychee - amazing varieties which lose much of their temper in transportation and need to be tasted straight from the plantations

3) Betel leaf - which is considered to be an addiction (when taken with tobacco) and as a digestive when taken with cardamom and cloves.

4) Banana - amazing varieties of banana can be found here. The area is filled with banana trees.

== Demographics ==
As per the 2001 census, Goraul block had a population of 135,502.

== Politics ==
Vindhyeshwari Prasad Varma (a.k.a. Binda Babu) of Manpura village was the first speaker of Bihar assembly after independence (1946–1962). His contribution to public affairs earned him the recognition of Padma Bhushan in 1961. He spent his last years with his eldest son Ram Chandra Prasad Varma in the village till his demise on 22nd Jul 1968. His eldest grandson Ishwar Chandra Varma presently resides here.

== Transport ==
Goraul railway station, on the Muzaffarpur-Hajipur branch line, which used to facilitate movement of sugar from the sugar mill to the markets now facilitates the seasonal movement of migrant agricultural labourer and movement of educated in search of employment to urban centres. Goraul is located on NH 22( OLD NH 77).

== Culture ==
The local language spoken by the people is Vajjika.

=== Festivals ===
Eid, Holi, Durga Pooja, Deepawali and Chath Pooja are the prime festivals. However people also celebrate Rakshabandhan, Janmashtmi, Shivratri, Makar sakranti, Saraswati puja and many other local festivals. Local Muslims take out Taziya processions, Hindus also celebrate other Muslim festivals in a very congenial environment.
