= Ziradei Assembly constituency =

Coordinates: 26°14′10″N 84°14′53″E

Ziradei
- Constituency No. 106 for the Bihar Legislative Assembly

Constituency details
- Country: India
- Region: East India
- State: Bihar
- District: Siwan
- Established: 1957
- Total electors: 276,435

Member of Legislative Assembly
- 18th Bihar Legislative Assembly
- Incumbent Bhism Pratap Singh Kushwaha
- Party: JD(U)
- Alliance: NDA
- Elected year: 2025
- Preceded by: Amarjeet Kushwaha

Ziradei Assembly constituency is an assembly constituency in Siwan district in the Indian state of Bihar.

== Overview ==
As per Delimitation of Parliamentary and Assembly constituencies Order, 2008, No. 106 Ziradei Assembly constituency is composed of the following: Ziradei, Nautan and Mairwa community development blocks.

Ziradei Assembly constituency is part of No. 18 Siwan (Lok Sabha constituency).

== Members of the Legislative Assembly ==
Year	Name	Party
1957	Zawar Hussain	Indian National Congress
1962	Raja Ram Choudhary	Swatantra Party
1967	Zawar Hussain	Indian National Congress
1969	Zawar Hussain	Indian National Congress
1972	Sankarnath Vidyarthi	Independent politician
1977	Raja Ram Choudhary	Indian National Congress
1980	Raghav Prasad	Janata Party
1985	Tribhuvan Singh	Indian National Congress
1990	Mohammad Shahabuddin	Independent politician
1995	Mohammad Shahabuddin	Janata Dal
1996^	Sheo Shanker Yadav	Janata Dal
2000	Azazul Haque	Rashtriya Janata Dal
2005	Azazul Haque	Rashtriya Janata Dal
2005	Shyam Bahadur Singh	Janata Dal (United)
2010	Asha Devi	Bharatiya Janata Party
2015	Ramesh Singh Kushwaha	Janata Dal (United)
2020	Amarjeet Kushwaha	Communist Party of India (Marxist–Leninist) Liberation
2025	Bhism Pratap Singh Kushwaha	Janata Dal (United)

== Election results ==
=== 2025 ===
2025 Bihar Legislative Assembly election: Ziradei
Party	Candidate	Votes	%	±%
JD(U)	Bhism Pratap Singh Kushwaha	66,227	41.94	+11.5
CPI(ML)L	Amarjeet Kushwaha	63,601	40.27	−7.84
JSP	Munna Pandey	10,125	6.41	
BSP	Pramod Kumar Mall	5,102	3.23	
SBSP	Jaglal Rajbhar	2,390	1.51	
Independent	Raghwendra Kumar Kharwar	2,263	1.43	
NOTA	None of the above	4,707	2.98	−0.3
Majority		2,626	1.67	−16.0
Turnout		157,926	57.13	+5.09
JD(U) gain from CPI(ML)L		Swing		

=== 2020 ===
2020 Bihar Legislative Assembly election: Ziradei
Party	Candidate	Votes	%	±%
CPI(ML)L	Amarjeet Kushwaha	69,442	48.11	
JD(U)	Kamla Singh	43,932	30.44	+0.45
LJP	Vinod Tiwari	7,155	4.96	
Independent	Ugam Pathak	4,943	3.42	
Independent	Shri Niwas Yadav	4,816	3.34	+0.05
Independent	Kumar Santosh	2,499	1.73	
JP	Mahatma Singh	1,738	1.2	
Independent	Rakesh Kumar Pandey	1,347	0.93	+0.35
NOTA	None of the above	4,739	3.28	+1.74
Majority		25,510	17.67	+13.19
Turnout		144,345	52.04	−1.55
CPI(ML)L gain from JD(U)		Swing		

=== 2015 ===
2015 Bihar Legislative Assembly election: Ziradei
Party	Candidate	Votes	%	±%
JD(U)	Ramesh Singh Kushwaha	40,760	29.99	
BJP	Asha Devi	34,669	25.51	
CPI(ML)L	Amarjeet Kushwaha	34,562	25.43	
Independent	Shri Niwas Yadav	4,478	3.29	
Independent	Brij Bihari Sharma	3,220	2.37	
SP	Rana Pratap Singh	3,162	2.33	
Independent	Sudhir Kumar Sinha	3,104	2.28	
Independent	Vijay Pratap Shahi	2,614	1.92	
NPP	Ravi Pandey	2,305	1.7	
SS	Udeshavar Kumar Singh	1,731	1.27	
NOTA	None of the above	2,098	1.54	
Majority		6,091	4.48	
Turnout		135,904	53.59	
JD(U) gain from BJP		Swing		

=== 2010 ===
2010 Bihar Legislative Assembly election: Ziradei
Party	Candidate	Votes	%	±%
BJP	Asha Devi	29,442	27.25	
CPI(ML)L	Amarjeet Kushwaha	20,522	18.99	
RJD	Shiva Shankar Yadav	12,555	11.62	
Independent	Rana Pratap Singh	8,737	8.09	
Turnout		108,043	54.39	
Registered electors		198,655		
BJP gain from JD(U)		Swing		
