= Hari Shankar Yadav =

Indian politician

Member of the Bihar Legislative Assembly
- In office 2015–2025
- Preceded by: Vikram Kunwar
- Succeeded by: Osama Shahab
- Constituency: Raghunathpur

Personal details
- Born: 1 January 1955 (age 71) Mirpur, Siwan District, Bihar
- Party: Rashtriya Janata Dal
- Occupation: Farmer; Businessman
- Profession: Politician

Hari Shankar Yadav (born 1 January 1955) is an Indian politician in Bihar. He was a member of Bihar Legislative Assembly from Raghunathpur in 2015 and 2020 from RJD.
