= Vaishali Assembly constituency =

Coordinates: 26°00′16″N 85°04′50″E

Vaishali
- Constituency No. 125 for the Bihar Legislative Assembly

Constituency details
- Country: India
- Region: East India
- State: Bihar
- District: Vaishali
- Established: 1967
- Total electors: 337,584

Member of Legislative Assembly
- 18th Bihar Legislative Assembly
- Incumbent Siddarth Patel
- Party: JD(U)
- Alliance: NDA
- Elected year: 2025

Vaishali Assembly constituency is an assembly constituency in Vaishali district in the Indian state of Bihar. It was established in 1967.

== Overview ==
As per Delimitation of Parliamentary and Assembly constituencies Order, 2008, No. 125 Vaishali Assembly constituency is composed of the following: Vaishali, Paterhi Belsar and Goraul community development blocks.

Vaishali Assembly constituency is part of No. 16 Vaishali (Lok Sabha constituency).

== Members of the Legislative Assembly ==
Year	Name	Party
1967	Laliteshwar Prasad Shahi	Indian National Congress
1969	Laliteshwar Prasad Shahi	Lok Tantrik Congress
1972	Laliteshwar Prasad Shahi	Indian National Congress
1977	Nagendra Prasad Singh	Janata Party
1980	Brishin Patel	Janata Party
1985	Brishin Patel	Lokdal
1990	Brishin Patel	Janata Dal
1991^	Hemant Kumar Shahi	Indian National Congress
1992^	Veena Shahi	Indian National Congress
1995	Raj Kishore Singh	Janata Dal
2000	Veena Shahi	Indian National Congress
2005	Brishin Patel	Janata Dal (United)
2005	Brishin Patel	Janata Dal (United)
2010	Brishin Patel	Janata Dal (United)
2015	Raj Kishore Singh	Janata Dal (United)
2020	Siddarth Patel	Janata Dal (United)
2025	Siddarth Patel	Janata Dal (United)

== Election results ==
=== 2025 ===
Bihar Legislative Assembly Election, 2025: Vaishali
Party	Candidate	Votes	%	±%
JD(U)	Siddarth Patel	108,377	45.6	+9.64
RJD	Ajay Kushwaha	75,787	31.89	
INC	Sanjeev Singh	20,395	8.58	−23.56
JSP	Sunil Kumar	9,108	3.83	
Independent	Brishin Patel	4,116	1.73	
Independent	Rubi Kumari	3,174	1.34	
SUCI(C)	Ram Nath Ray	2,823	1.19	
BSP	Nisha Raj	2,321	0.98	
NOTA	None of the above	4,562	1.92	−0.74
Majority		32,590	13.71	+9.89
Turnout		237,684	70.41	+11.4
JD(U) hold		Swing		

=== 2020 ===
2020 Bihar Legislative Assembly election: Vaishali
Party	Candidate	Votes	%	±%
JD(U)	Siddharth Patel	69,780	35.96	−11.66
INC	Sanjeev Singh	62,367	32.14	
LJP	Ajay Kumar Kushwaha	33,351	17.18	
Independent	Sugandh Kumar	5,582	2.88	
Independent	Raj Narayan Kumar	4,386	2.26	
Independent	Abhishek Raj	2,864	1.48	
JP(S)	Tarun Singh Alias Pintoo	2,735	1.41	
Bhartiya Sablog Party	Arun Kumar Singh	2,190	1.13	
NOTA	None of the above	5,155	2.66	+0.09
Majority		7,413	3.82	−14.84
Turnout		194,073	59.01	+2.74
JD(U) hold		Swing		

=== 2015 ===
2015 Bihar Legislative Assembly election: Vaishali
Party	Candidate	Votes	%	±%
JD(U)	Raj Kishore Singh	79,286	47.62	
HAM(S)	Brishin Patel	48,225	28.96	
Independent	Vinay Paswan	7,975	4.79	
LKD	Rajnarayan Kumar	4,695	2.82	
JAP(L)	Mahtab Ahmad Khan	4,301	2.58	
Independent	Muhamad Abas	2,765	1.66	
Independent	Amiya Bhushan	2,009	1.21	
Independent	Mahabir Prasad	1,959	1.18	
Aap Aur Hum Party	Kundan Singh	1,735	1.04	
SUCI(C)	Sigeshwar Bhagat	1,663	1.0	
Gareeb Aadmi Party	Sudhir Ku Sharma	1,556	0.93	
NOTA	None of the above	4,275	2.57	
Majority		31,061	18.66	
Turnout		166,498	56.27	
