= Kavita Singh (politician) =

Indian politician

Member of Parliament, Lok Sabha
- In office 23 May 2019 – 4 June 2024
- Preceded by: Om Prakash Yadav
- Succeeded by: Vijay Lakshmi Kushwaha
- Constituency: Siwan

Member of Bihar Legislative Assembly
- In office 20 September 2011 – 23 May 2019
- Preceded by: Jagmato Devi
- Succeeded by: Karanjeet alias Vyas Singh
- Constituency: Daraunda

Personal details
- Born: 5 March 1986 (age 40) Siwan, Bihar, India
- Party: Janata Dal (United)
- Spouse: Ajay Kumar Singh
- Occupation: Politician

Kavita Singh is an Indian politician from Janata Dal (United). She contested the 2019 Indian general election from Siwan Lok Sabha seat and won. She has also served as the Member of Legislative Assembly from the Daraunda seat in 2011 bypolls and the 2015 elections, a seat which was earlier won by her mother-in-law Jagmato Devi. She is a postgraduate student of JP University, she filed her nomination right in her bridal attire after marriage. She became a MLA at the age of 26 years. She is married to gangster turned politician Ajay Kumar Singh.
