= Brishin Patel =

Indian politician

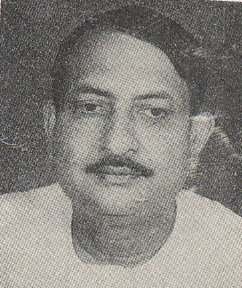

Member of Parliament, Lok Sabha
- In office 1991-1996
- Preceded by: Janardan Tiwari
- Succeeded by: Mohammad Shahabuddin
- Constituency: Siwan, Bihar

Member of the Bihar Legislative Assembly
- In office 2005–2015
- Preceded by: Veena Shahi
- Succeeded by: Raj Kishore Singh
- Constituency: Vaishali
- In office 1980–1991
- Preceded by: Nagendra Prasad
- Succeeded by: Hemant Kumar Shahi
- Constituency: Vaishali

Minister of Transport Government of Bihar
- In office 26 November 2010 – 22 February 2015
- Preceded by: Ramanand Prasad Singh
- Succeeded by: Dulal Chandra Goswami

Personal details
- Born: 1 January 1946 (age 80) Hajipur, Bihar, British India
- Party: Rashtriya Janata Dal
- Other political affiliations: Janata Dal (United); Janata Dal; Hindustani Awam Morcha

Brishin Patel is an Indian politician. He was elected to the Lok Sabha, the lower house of the Parliament of India from the Siwan in Bihar as a member of the Janata Dal. He was Minister of Education and Transport in Nitish Kumar cabinet. He was elected for record 6 times Member of Legislative Assembly from Vaishali, Bihar.

He joined Hindustani Awam Morcha when former Chief Minister of Bihar, Jitan Ram Manjhi, who left the Janata Dal (United) along with 18 others to form the party following the 2015 Bihar political crisis. He lost Vaishali seat in 2015 Bihar Legislative Assembly election. He was named as state president of Hindustani Awam Morcha. He left HAM Party and later joined RJD in 2020, before Bihar Assembly Election 2020.
