= Siwan Assembly constituency =

Coordinates: 26°13′N 84°22′E

Siwan
- Constituency No. 105 for the Bihar Legislative Assembly

Constituency details
- Country: India
- Region: East India
- State: Bihar
- District: Siwan
- Lok Sabha constituency: Siwan
- Established: 1951
- Total electors: 319,165

Member of Legislative Assembly
- 18th Bihar Legislative Assembly
- Incumbent Mangal Pandey
- Party: BJP
- Alliance: NDA
- Elected year: 2025
- Preceded by: Awadh Bihari Choudhary; RJD

Siwan is an assembly constituency in Siwan district in the Indian state of Bihar. In 2015 Bihar Legislative Assembly election, Siwan will be one of the 36 seats to have VVPAT enabled electronic voting machines.

== Overview ==
As per Delimitation of Parliamentary and Assembly constituencies Order, 2008, No. 105 Siwan Assembly constituency is composed of the following: Siwan community development block including Siwan Municipal Council; Lakri, Pakri, Aurae, Lakri Dargah, Kailgarh Uttar, Kailgarh Dakhin, Sunderpur and Hathigai gram panchayats of Barharia CD Block.

Siwan Assembly constituency is part of No. 18 Siwan (Lok Sabha constituency) . The former MLA Vyasdev Prasad of BJP had won this particular assembly seat 3 times in a row since 2005. Present MLA of Siwan is Shri Awadh Bihari Choudhary from RJD elected in 2020.

== Members of the Legislative Assembly ==
Year	Name	Party
1952	Shankar Nath	Indian National Congress
1952	Ram Baswan Ram	Indian National Congress
1957	Gadadhar Pd. Shrivastava	Indian National Congress
1959^	S. Devi	Indian National Congress
1962	Janardan Tiwari	Bharatiya Jana Sangh
1967	Raja Ram Chaudhry	Indian National Congress
1969	Janardan Tiwari	Bharatiya Jana Sangh
1972	Janardan Tiwari	Bharatiya Jana Sangh
1977	Ghulam Sarwar	Janata Party
1980	Janardan Tiwari	Bharatiya Janata Party
1985	Awadh Bihari Choudhary	Janata Party
1990	Awadh Bihari Choudhary	Janata Dal
1995	Awadh Bihari Choudhary	Janata Dal
2000	Awadh Bihari Choudhary	Rashtriya Janata Dal
2005	Awadh Bihari Choudhary	Rashtriya Janata Dal
2005	Vyas Deo Prasad	Bharatiya Janata Party
2010	Vyas Deo Prasad	Bharatiya Janata Party
2015	Vyas Deo Prasad	Bharatiya Janata Party
2020	Awadh Bihari Choudhary	Rashtriya Janata Dal
2025	Mangal Pandey	Bharatiya Janata Party

== Election results ==
=== 2025 ===
2025 Bihar Legislative Assembly election: Siwan
Party	Candidate	Votes	%	±%
BJP	Mangal Pandey	92,379	48.47	▲4.34
RJD	Awadh Bihari Choudhary	83,009	43.56	▼1.74
AIMIM	Kafi Samshir	3,493	1.83	
JSP	Intekhab Ahmad	2,543	1.33	
BSP	Sunita Devi	2,183	1.15	
Independent	Sushil Kumar	1,998	1.05	
NOTA	None of the above	2,704	1.42	▲0.58
Majority		9,370	4.91	▲3.74
Turnout		190,582	59.71	▲5.29
BJP gain from RJD		Swing	BJP	

=== 2020 ===
2020 Bihar Legislative Assembly election: Siwan
Party	Candidate	Votes	%	±%
RJD	Awadh Bihari Chaudhary	76,785	45.3	
BJP	Om Prakash Yadav	74,812	44.13	+9.11
Independent	Vinod Kumar Srivastava	2,582	1.52	
Independent	Rajan Kumar	2,346	1.38	
RLSP	Abdul Rizwan Ansari	2,338	1.38	
Independent	Vyasdeo Prasad	1,871	1.1	
Independent	Nematullah Khan	1,582	0.93	
The Plurals Party	Rameshwar Kumar	1,552	0.92	
NOTA	None of the above	1,416	0.84	−2.41
Majority		1,973	1.17	−1.07
Turnout		169,519	54.42	−1.66
RJD gain from BJP		Swing		

=== 2015 ===
2015 Bihar Legislative Assembly election: Siwan
Party	Candidate	Votes	%	±%
BJP	Vyas Deo Prasad	55,156	35.02	
JD(U)	Bablu Prasad	51,622	32.78	
Independent	Avadh Vihari Choudhari	28,450	18.06	
Independent	Harendra Dubey	4,254	2.7	
SS	Vinod Kumar Srivastav	4,102	2.6	
CPI(ML)L	Jamil Ahmad	1,997	1.27	
Independent	Birendra Sah	1,542	0.98	
Independent	Kaushal Kishore Yadav	1,458	0.93	
NOTA	None of the above	5,119	3.25	
Majority		3,534	2.24	
Turnout		157,489	56.08	

=== 2020 ===
2020 Bihar Legislative Assembly election: Siwan
Party	Candidate	Votes	%	±%
RJD	Awadh Bihari Choudhary	76,785	45.30	new
BJP	Om Prakash Yadav	74,812	44.13	+9.13
Margin of victory		1,973		
RJD gain from BJP		Swing		
