= Karanjeet Singh =

Indian politician

Member of Bihar Legislative Assembly
- Incumbent
- Assumed office 2019
- Preceded by: Kavita Singh
- Constituency: Daraunda

Personal details
- Born: 12 December 1974 (age 51)
- Party: Bharatiya Janata Party
- Parent: Bacha Singh

Karanjeet Singh, also known as Vyas Singh, is an Indian politician who was elected as a Member of the Legislative Assembly for Daraunda (Vidhan Sabha constituency) in 2019 as an independent candidate & in 2020 on a BJP ticket.
