= Amar Nath Yadav =

Indian politician

Member of Bihar Legislative Assembly
- In office 1995–2000
- Preceded by: Sheo Shankar Yadav
- Succeeded by: Sheo Shankar Yadav
- Constituency: Darauli
- In office 2005–2010
- Preceded by: Sheo Shankar Yadav
- Succeeded by: Ramayan Manjhi
- Constituency: Darauli

Personal details
- Born: 1964 or 1965 (age 61–62)
- Party: Communist Party of India (Marxist-Leninist) Liberation

Amar Nath Yadav, alternatively Amarnath Yadav is an Indian politician and former member of the Bihar Legislative Assembly. He is a veteran leader of the Communist Party of India (Marxist–Leninist) Liberation and a member of the Bihar State Committee of the party. He has also been the vice president of the Kisan Mahasabha in Bihar. He is known for his opposition to the erstwhile rule of local strongman Mohammad Shahabuddin and described by a Hindustan Times article as "the only man who stood up to Shahabuddin". He had represented the Darauli constituency from 1995–2000 and from 2005–2010. He rose to prominence in the area after the murder of the student leader Chandrashekhar Prasad in 1997, who died whilst campaigning against Shahabuddin.

== Early life ==
Amarnath Yadav was born in the village of Kabilpura in the Siwan district of Bihar.

== Legislator ==
Yadav contested the Darauli seat in the Bihar Legislative Assembly election of 1990 as an Indian People's Front candidate. He finished in fourth place with 16,623 votes (17.47% of the votes in the constituency). He won the Darauli seat in the 1995 election, standing as a CPI(ML) Liberation candidate. He obtained 36,305 votes (37.25%). Soon after the election, however, he was arrested and jailed. The party rebuffed the allegations against him, calling them 'false charges'. He was attacked in February 1999; during the attack a security guard of Yadav was killed. According to CPI(ML) Liberation the state government failed to take action to punish the culprits.

He lost Darauli in the 2000 election, finishing in second place with 33,990 votes (29.82%). He regained Darauli in the February 2005 election, obtaining 25,197 votes, and retained the seat in the October 2005 election, with 30,355 votes in his favour. He stood as the candidate of assembly election from Raghunathpur constituency in 2015.

== Lok Sabha candidate ==
Yadav was fielded by CPI(ML) as its candidate in the Siwan Lok Sabha seat in the 1999 Indian general election. His main opponent was Shahabuddin. Yadav finished in second place with 255,229 votes (36.34%). He again contested the Siwan seat in the 2004 and 2009 Indian general election, finishing in third place in both occasions. In 2004 he obtained 72,225 votes, whilst in 2009 he got 72,988 votes (11.37%). Yadav was fielded by CPI(ML) Liberation as its candidate in Siwan in the 2014 Indian general election.
