= Osama Shahab =

Indian politician

Member of Bihar Legislative Assembly
- Incumbent
- Assumed office 14 November 2025
- Preceded by: Hari Shankar Yadav
- Constituency: Raghunathpur

Personal details
- Born: Siwan, Bihar, India
- Party: Rashtriya Janata Dal (RJD)
- Spouse: Dr. Ayesha Sabih
- Children: 1 son
- Parents: Mohammad Shahabuddin (father); Hena Shahab (mother)
- Occupation: Politician

Osama Shahab is an Indian politician from the state of Bihar, and he is the Member of Bihar Legislative Assembly from Raghunathpur Assembly constituency. He is also a member of the Rashtriya Janata Dal (RJD) and is known for being the son of the controversial and influential late politician, Mohammad Shahabuddin, a former Member of Parliament and Member of the Legislative Assembly from Siwan. Osama formally entered active politics in 2024 and won the 2025 Bihar Legislative Assembly election.

== Early life and background ==
Osama Shahab was born in Siwan, Bihar. His father was Mohammad Shahabuddin, a prominent robinhood figure in Bihar. His mother, Hena Shahab, is also politically active and has contested elections, keeping the family's political legacy alive. Following his father's death in 2021, Osama and his mother decided to formally enter active politics to continue the family's influence.

== Political career ==
Osama Shahab officially entered the political arena in 2024 when he joined the Rashtriya Janata Dal (RJD). This move was seen as a strategic continuation of the Shahabuddin family's political presence in the Siwan region. Osama Shahab is contesting for the first time from the Raghunathpur constituency in Siwan, Bihar, as a candidate of the Rashtriya Janata Dal in the 17th Bihar Legislative Assembly election.
