= Bhism Pratap Singh Kushwaha =

Indian politician

Member of Bihar Legislative Assembly
- Incumbent
- Assumed office 2025
- Preceded by: Amarjeet Kushwaha
- Constituency: Ziradei

Personal details
- Party: Janata Dal (United)
- Profession: Politician

Bhism Pratap Singh also known as Bhism Pratap Singh Kushwaha is a member of Bihar Legislative Assembly. He was elected to Bihar Legislative Assembly from Ziradei Assembly constituency of Siwan in 2025 elections to Bihar Legislative Assembly. He is a member of Janata Dal (United) political party.
