= Natwarlal =

Indian con man and forger (1912–2009)

- Born: Mithilesh Kumar Srivastava; 1912; Bangra, Siwan, Bihar and Orissa Province, British India
- Disappeared: 24 June 1996; New Delhi Railway Station, New Delhi, Delhi, India
- Died: 25 July 2009 (aged 97) (disputed)
- Monuments: Statue in Bangra (Bangar)
- Occupation: Con man
- Years active: 1937–1996

Natwarlal (born Mithilesh Kumar Srivastava; 1912 — 25 July 2009) was an Indian fraudster known for his high-profile crimes and prison escapes, including having supposedly "sold" the Taj Mahal, the Red Fort, the Rashtrapati Bhavan, and the Parliament House of India on multiple occasions. If valued today, these properties would be worth approximately ₹129 billion ($1.4 billion) in total.

== Early life ==
Natwarlal was born Mithilesh Kumar Srivastava in the village of Bangra in the Siwan district of Bihar. He was the older of two brothers. His father was a station master.

Natwarlal first discovered his ability to forge after a neighbour sent him to deposit his bank drafts. Realising he could easily forge his neighbour's signature, he managed to withdraw 1,000 rupees from his neighbour's account before he noticed. Fleeing to Calcutta, Natwarlal enrolled as a student for a bachelor of commerce degree while working as a casual stock broker. He also tried to set up a cloth business, but failed.

His house in Bangra is said to have been demolished by the British, though the land still belongs to his family.

== Career ==
As Natwarlal's father was a station master, he knew information about the railway freight industry in India. Likewise, his bachelor of commerce degree and his stint as a stock broker gave him the knowledge of banking rules. His ability to forge documents and signatures helped him successfully pull off various cons.

After his first arrest in 1937 for stealing nine tonnes of iron, Natwarlal temporarily changed tactics. According to police, he would visit prostitutes regularly, give them tainted liquor, steal their jewellery and money, and escape. However, Natwarlal soon deemed this tactic too dangerous, and he went back to conning.

Natwarlal is said to have duped hundreds of shop owners, jewellers, bankers, and foreigners of lakhs of rupees, using over fifty different aliases to disguise himself. He often used novel ideas to cheat people, such as one instance in the 1950s where he swindled the Punjab National Bank out of ₹6.5 lakhs in a scam involving rail freight and bags of rice. He was also proficient in forging signatures of famous personalities. He is said to have supposedly cheated a number of industrialists including the Tatas, the Birlas, and Dhirubhai Ambani, taking from them huge sums of money. A legend states that Natwarlal once "sold" the Parliament House to a foreigner; included in the purchase were the members of parliament themselves. He sometimes posed as a social worker or needy people, though he would also pose as a business manager and purchasing officer. He often paid his victims with fake cheques and demand drafts.

Natwarlal was reportedly a Robin Hood-like figure in Bangra, his native village. He is said to have given his earnings to the less-fortunate. Tales of his cons, which tended to be non-violent and only targeted the rich and wealthy, made him very popular. According to a resident of Siwan town, Natwartal's presence drew very large crowds whenever he visited. In one reported instance, Natwarlal went to Bangra to host a large feast for everyone in the village using his spoils. During the feast, he gave ₹100 to each poor villager before vanishing.

Natwarlal's high-profile crimes often got him major sentences, with his jail time reaching increasingly high numbers. In Bihar alone, Natwarlal faced charges of 14 cases of forgery and was sentenced to 113 years in prison. Natwarlal was arrested nine or ten times, but most of these times, he was able to break out and escape. His escapes were often very cunning: for example, in 1957, Natwarlal escaped the Kanpur jail by donning a smuggled police uniform, bribing his cell guards with a suitcase full of money, then walking out the front gate, passing guards who saluted him. The suitcase actually contained only newspapers. Due to his repeated escapes, it is believed he only spent 20 years in prison over the course of his life.

The last time Natwarlal was arrested was in 1996 at the age of 84. Despite his old age and his use of a wheelchair, he managed to escape again and was last seen by authorities on 24 June 1996 at the New Delhi railway station, while being transported by police from the Kanpur jail to the All India Institute of Medical Sciences, New Delhi for treatment, after which he was never seen again.

== Death ==
In 2009, Natwarlal's lawyer requested that more than 100 charges pending against him be dropped, claiming that he died on 25 July 2009. However, Natwarlal's brother subsequently claimed to have cremated him in 1996, the year he last escaped, in Ranchi. For this reason, his precise date of death is uncertain.

He had two wives. He was survived by one daughter.

== Legacy ==
Natwarlal is considered to be the greatest con man in Indian history. In India, con men who pull off particularly smart cons are often called Natwarlal, and many Indian fraudsters say they were inspired by his career. His exploits have been compared to those of Frank Abagnale and Victor Lustig.

Many of his purported schemes are believed to be myths and legends, making the act of piecing his actual history together very difficult. In 1987, Arvind Jain, superintendent of police in Varanasi, said of Natwarlal's career:

"He is remarkably clever. I don't believe that he was a pauper, as he claims to be. Or the stuff about distributing his money to the poor and having no vices. We need to probe more intensively into his past."

The people of Bangra take pride in the fact that he belonged to their village. In 2011, the village planned to erect a statue of Natwarlal at the site of his former house.

== In popular culture ==
His life has been romanticised and adapted into films, namely the 1979 film Mr. Natwarlal and the 2014 film Raja Natwarlal. A crime television programme based on Natwarlal's life, Jurm, was aired in 2004 by Aaj Tak.
