= Khalispur, Siwan =

Khalispur
- Village
- Location in Bihar, India Khalispur (India)
- Coordinates: 26°15′32″N 84°19′40″E
- Country: India
- State: Bihar
- District: Siwan
- Subdistrict: Siwan

Population (2011)
  - Total: 4,285
- Time zone: UTC+05:30 (IST)
- Pincode: 841227
- Telephone code: 06154
- ISO 3166 code: IN-BR

Khalispur is a village in Siwan block, Siwan district, Bihar, India. This village has a huge Mosque called as "The Jama Masjid of Khalishpur" and has a Madrsa at Khalishpur Bazar.There are many students who are in different reputed institutions of India from Khalishpur and listed001(NA) is one of them. The population was 4,285 at the 2011 Indian census.
