= Awadh Bihari Choudhary =

Indian politician

Speaker of the Bihar Legislative Assembly
- In office 26 August 2022 – 12 February 2024
- Preceded by: Vijay Kumar Sinha
- Succeeded by: Nand Kishore Yadav

Member of Bihar Legislative Assembly
- In office 2020–2025
- Preceded by: Vyas Deo Prasad
- Succeeded by: Mangal Pandey
- Constituency: Siwan
- In office 1985–2005
- Preceded by: Janardan Tiwari
- Succeeded by: Vyas Deo Prasad
- Constituency: Siwan

Personal details
- Born: Awadh Bihari Choudhary; 17 August 1954 (age 72) Siwan, Bihar, India
- Party: Rashtriya Janata Dal (1997-present)
- Other political affiliations: Janata Dal (before 1997); Janata Party
- Profession: Politician, social worker

Awadh Bihari Choudhary, also known as Awadh Bihari Yadav, is an Indian politician. He served as the Speaker of the Bihar Legislative Assembly, Government of Bihar. He has been elected five times from Siwan constituency as a member of Janata Dal as well as Rashtriya Janata Dal. He is one of the most senior politicians in Rashtriya Janata Dal, and has also earlier served as an Education Minister of Bihar in Rabri Devi government.
