= Shyam Bahadur Singh =

Indian politician

Member Of Bihar Legislative Assembly For Barharia
- In office 2005–2020
- Preceded by: Baccha Pandey
- Constituency: Barharia

Personal details
- Born: 11 July 1963 (age 62) Tarwara, Siwan, Bihar
- Party: Janata Dal (United)
- Spouse: Kamlavati Devi
- Children: 3
- Education: 8th pass

Shyam Bahadur Singh Patel (born 11 July 1963) is an Indian politician from Bihar. He is three time former member of the Bihar Legislative Assembly representing Janata Dal (United).

== Early life and education ==
Singh was born in Tarwara, Siwan district, Bihar. He is the son of Suryadev Singh. He passed Class 8 in 1972 at Government High School, Din Dayalpur, Tarwara. Later, he discontinued his studies. He married Kamlavati Devi, and they have three children.

== Career ==
Bahadur Singh became an MLA for the first time winning the October 2005 Bihar Legislative Assembly election from Ziradei Assembly constituency representing Janata Dal (United). Later, he won two more times from Barharia Assembly constituency in 2010 and 2015 Bihar Legislative Assembly election representing Janata Dal (United).
