= Om Prakash Yadav =

Indian politician

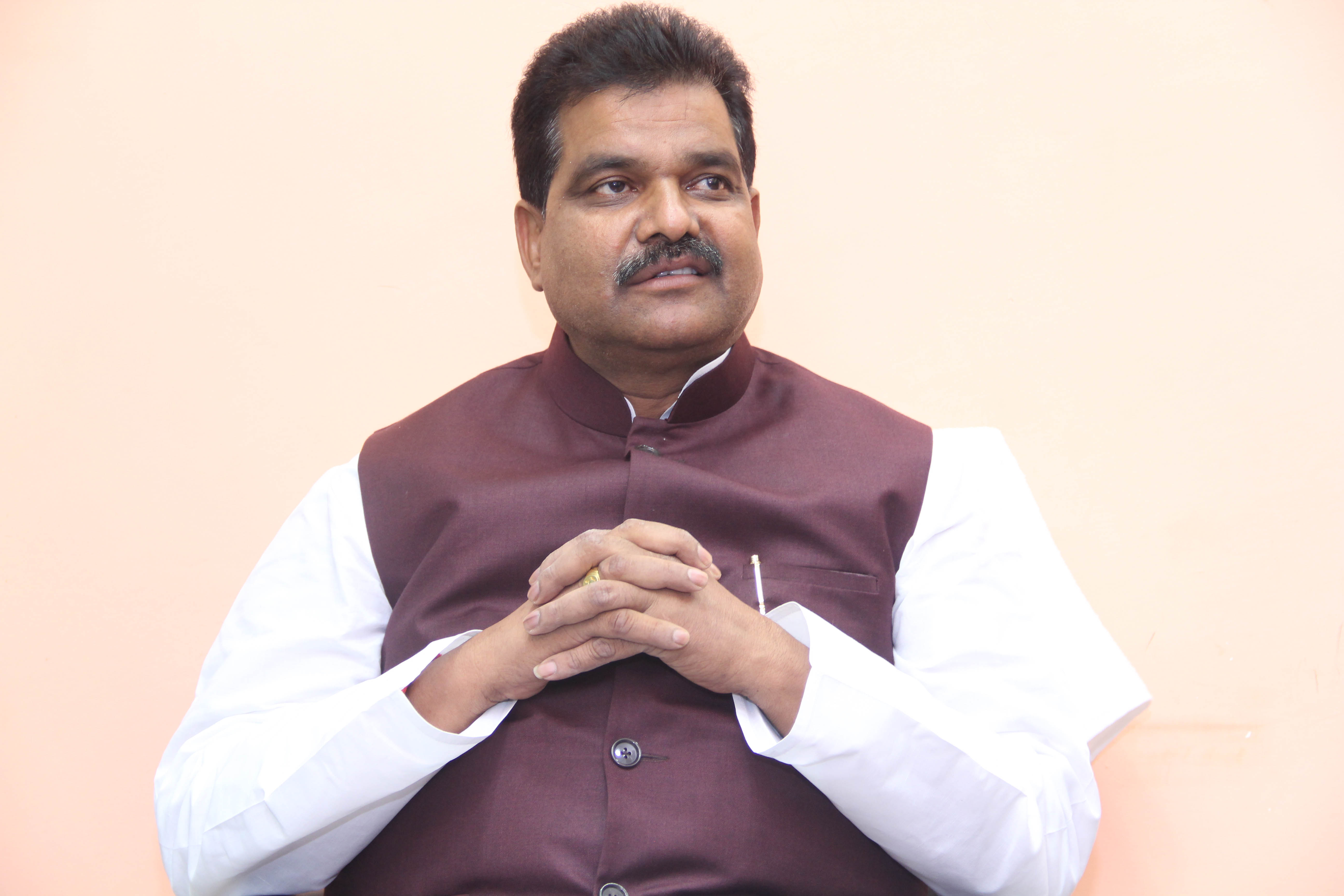

Member of the India Parliament for Siwan
- In office 16 May 2009 – 23 May 2019
- Preceded by: Mohammad Shahabuddin
- Succeeded by: Kavita Singh

Personal details
- Born: 23 March 1962 (age 64) Laheji, Siwan, Bihar, India
- Party: BJP
- Spouse: Radhika Devi (m. 1980)
- Children: 6
- Education: D.A.V. College
- Profession: Agriculturist; Politician
- As of 19 September, 2021

Om Prakash Yadav (born 23 March 1963) is an Indian politician and National Vice-President of Bharatiya Janata Party Kisan Morcha. In the Indian General Election, 2009, he was elected to the 15th Lok Sabha from Siwan, by defeating Hena Shahab by a margin over 63,000 votes.

Yadav was a member and contested elections for Nitish Kumar's Janata Dal (United) party. However, in 2009, he was not selected to as the party candidate from Siwan Yadav decided to fight the elections as an Independent, and Siwan became one of the few seats in Bihar that did not go to the former JD(U)-BJP alliance.

He joined Bharatiya Janata Party on 27 January 2014.

== Personal life ==
Yadav was born on 23 March 1962 in Laheji, Siwan district of Bihar to Ramanand Yadav and Simato Devi. He completed his bachelor of Science degree from DAV College, Siwan. Yadav married Radhika Devi on 1 May 1980, with whom he has five daughters and a son. He is a resident of Malviya Nagar in Siwan district.

== 2004 elections ==
In 2004, Om Prakash Yadav contested the general elections as a JD-U party candidate and lost to Shahabuddin, who was also in jail then, but could fight elections since he was yet to be convicted. There was widespread intimidation, and opponents were not able to campaign effectively because of an aura of fear. Despite this, Om Prakash managed to get more than 2 lakh votes against Shahabuddin. Subsequently there was widespread violence against his the-then JD-U party

For the crime of having dared put up a credible fight, nine JD workers were killed in the days following the election. Yadav was assigned a team of eight bodyguards.

Om Prakash Yadav himself had to flee his hometown of Lalji near Siwan, and wait out the ganglord's anger while the newly elected state government worked on providing him security.

== 2009 elections ==
In the 2009 elections, his main opponent Hena Shahab never campaigned, showing herself in public only at a few meetings with RJD supremo Lalu Prasad Yadav and their star campaigner, movie actor Sanjay Dutt. She never spoke at the huge rallies, but only waved her hand. It was clear that the campaign was being run in Shahabuddin's name, by his well-oiled election machinery, though many of his gang members, such as Rustam Mia, Dhruv Jayaswal, Shubrati Mia, Munsi Mia and others were in Siwan jail.

Also, since Nitish Kumar came to power in Bihar in 2005, he set up fast track courts that have sent 14,000 criminals to jail, and the atmosphere of intimidation appears to have eased up considerably. So much so, that even criminal-politicians put up JD-U - Prabhunath Singh of Maharajganj and Vijay Kumar Shukla of Vaishali, also lost.
