= Siwan Lok Sabha constituency =

Indian parliament lower house electorate

Coordinates: 26.2°N 84.4°E

Siwan
- Lok Sabha constituency

Constituency details
- Country: India
- Region: East India
- State: Bihar
- Assembly constituencies: Siwan; Ziradei; Darauli; Raghunathpur; Daraunda; Barharia
- Established: 1956
- Reservation: None

Member of Parliament
- 18th Lok Sabha
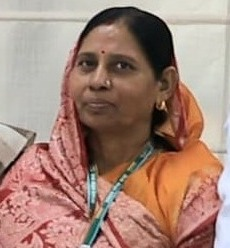
- Incumbent Vijay Lakshmi Kushwaha
- Party: JD(U)
- Alliance: NDA
- Elected year: 2024
- Preceded by: Kavita Singh

Siwan is a Lok Sabha constituency in the state of Bihar in India. The Lok Sabha is the lower house of the Parliament of India. The constituency was formed following the States Reorganisation Act of 1956 and the constituency boundaries were readjusted by the Delimitation Order of 2008. The constituency consists of 6 Assembly segments (constituencies) of the Bihar Legislative Assembly.

Most successful parties from Siwan Lok Sabha
1. INC (6 times) (35.0%)
2. RJD (3 times) (18.0%)
3. JD (2 times) (12.0%)
4. JD(U) (2 times) (12.0%)
5. BJP (2 times) (12.0%)
6. JP (1 time) (6.00%)
7. IND (1 time) (5.00%)

== Overview ==
The Siwan constituency of the Lok Sabha is encompassed in the administrative district of Siwan of the state of Bihar. The constituency is assigned the number 18 of the 40 Lok Sabha constituencies of the state of Bihar by the Election Commission of India. It consists of 6 Assembly segments (constituencies) numbered 105–110 of the Bihar Legislative Assembly, one of which is reserved for Scheduled Caste (SC) candidates in accordance with the Delimitation Order of 2008 implemented on the basis of the Delimitation Act of 2002. The Siwan constituency of the Lok Sabha has no reservation status.

== Assembly segments ==
#	Name	District	Member	Party	2024 lead
105	Siwan	Siwan	Mangal Pandey	BJP	JD(U)
106	Ziradei	Siwan	Bhism Pratap Kushwaha	JD(U)	JD(U)
107	Darauli (SC)	Siwan	Vishnu Deo Paswan	LJP(RV)	JD(U)
108	Raghunathpur	Siwan	Osama Shahab	RJD	IND
109	Daraunda	Siwan	Karanjeet Singh	BJP	JD(U)
110	Barharia	Siwan	Indradev Singh Patel	JD(U)	JD(U)

== Members of Parliament ==
Year	Name	Party
1957	Jhulan Sinha	Indian National Congress
1962	Mohammad Yusuf	Indian National Congress
1967	Mohammad Yusuf	Indian National Congress
1971	Mohammad Yusuf	Indian National Congress
1977	Mrityunjay Prasad	Janata Party
1980	Mohammad Yusuf	Indian National Congress
1984	Abdul Ghafoor	Indian National Congress
1989	Janardan Tiwari	Bharatiya Janata Party
1991	Brishin Patel	Janata Dal
1996	Mohammad Shahabuddin	Janata Dal
1998	Mohammad Shahabuddin	Rashtriya Janata Dal
1999	Mohammad Shahabuddin	Rashtriya Janata Dal
2004	Mohammad Shahabuddin	Rashtriya Janata Dal
2009	Om Prakash Yadav	Independent
2014	Om Prakash Yadav	Bharatiya Janata Party
2019	Kavita Singh	Janata Dal (United)
2024	Vijay Lakshmi Kushwaha	Janata Dal (United)

== Election results ==
=== 2024 ===
2024 Indian general elections: Siwan
Party	Candidate	Votes	%	±%
JD(U)	Vijay Lakshmi Kushwaha	386,508	38.73	
Independent	Hena Shahab	2,93,651	29.42	
RJD	Awadh Bihari Choudhary	1,98,823	19.92	
NOTA	None of the above	26,964		
Majority		92,857		
Turnout		9,98,204	52.48	
JD(U) hold		Swing		

=== 2019 ===
2019 Indian general elections: Siwan
Party	Candidate	Votes	%	±%
JD(U)	Kavita Singh	448,473	45.54	+3.38
RJD	Hena Shahab	3,31,515	33.66	+4.38
CPI(ML)L	Amar Nath Yadav	74,644	7.58	−1.56
Independent	Upendra Kumar Giri	17,353	1.76	
Independent	Madhuri Pandey	12,928	1.31	
BSP	Balmiki Prasad Gupta	8,467	0.86	−0.79
NOTA	None of the above	8,486	0.86	
Majority		1,16,958		
Turnout		9,84,850	54.73	
JD(U) gain from BJP		Swing		

=== 2014 ===
2014 Indian general elections: Siwan
Party	Candidate	Votes	%	±%
BJP	Om Prakash Yadav	372,670	42.16	
RJD	Hena Shahab	258,823	29.28	
CPI(ML)L	Amar Nath Yadav	81,006	9.16	
JD(U)	Manoj Kumar Singh	79,239	8.96	
BSP	Ganesh Ram	14,584	1.65	
BED	Ram Binay Ray	11,757		
AAP	Satya Prakash Pandey	10,542		
GGP	Khalil Miya	9,580		
BVM	Ranjan Kumar	8,851		
BMP	Parmeshwar Manjhi	5,683		
SwSP	Paramanand Gond	4,016		
JPJD	Narad Pandit	3,250		
LJP(S)	Nagendra Tiwari	2,611		
None of the above		21,409	2.42	
Majority		1,13,847		
Turnout		884021	56.53	
BJP gain from Independent		Swing		

=== 2009 ===
General Election, 2009: Siwan
Party	Candidate	Votes	%	±%
Independent	Om Prakash Yadav	236,194	36.8	
RJD	Hena Shahab	1,72,764	26.9	
CPI(ML)L	Amar Nath Yadav	72,988	11.4	
JD(U)	Brishin Patel	43,968	6.8	
BSP	Parash Nath Pathak	26,940	4.2	
Independent	Rajendra Kumar	18,558	2.9	
Independent	Shambhu Nath Prasad	12,132	1.9	
Independent	Vijay Shanker Dubey	12,104	1.9	
Majority		63,430	9.9	
Turnout		6,41,902	50.1	
Independent gain from RJD		Swing		

=== 2004 ===
General Election, 2004: Siwan
Party	Candidate	Votes	%	±%
RJD	Shahabuddin	317,511	49.8	
JD(U)	Om Prakash Yadav	2,13,933	33.6	
CPI(ML)L	Amar Nath Yadav	72,225	11.3	
GGP	Ramprit God	8,999	1.4	
BSP	Shankar Prasad Yadav	8,043	1.3	
Independent	Prem Chand Tiwari	7,542	1.2	
Independent	Ashok Ram	6,085	1	
Independent	Nasir Khan	3,211	0.50	
Majority		1,03,578	16.2	
Turnout		6,37,544	60.5	
RJD hold		Swing		

== See also ==
- Siwan
- List of constituencies of the Lok Sabha
