= Mohammad Shahabuddin (Indian politician) =

Indian criminal (1980 –2021)

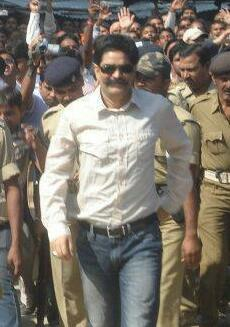

Member of Parliament in Lok Sabha
- In office 10 May 1996 – 16 May 2009
- Preceded by: Brishin Patel
- Succeeded by: Om Prakash Yadav
- Constituency: Siwan

Member (MLA) of Bihar Legislative Assembly
- In office 1990–1996
- Preceded by: Tribhuan Singh
- Succeeded by: Sheo Shanker Yadav
- Constituency: Ziradei

Personal details
- Born: 10 May 1967 Partappur, Siwan, Bihar, India
- Died: 1 May 2021 (aged 53) Delhi, India
- Party: Rashtriya Janata Dal
- Other political affiliations: Janata Dal
- Spouse: Hena Shahab (m. 1991)
- Children: 3 (including Osama Shahab)
- Parents: Sheikh Mohd Hasibullah (father); Madina Begum (mother)

Mohammad Shahabuddin (10 May 1967 – 1 May 2021) was an Indian criminal turned politician from the state of Bihar, who later became a politician, serving as an MLA and Member of Parliament from the Siwan constituency in the state of Bihar. He was a former member of the National Executive Committee of the Janata Dal and the Rashtriya Janata Dal. Shahabuddin was disqualified from contesting elections following his conviction for the kidnapping and disappearance of Chote Lal Gupta, an activist of the Communist Party of India (Marxist–Leninist) Liberation for which he was serving a life sentence. He was also accused of killing 15 other Communist Party activists, including the former student leader Chandrashekhar Prasad.

Shahabuddin was elected for four successive terms to the Indian Parliament between 1996 and 2004 from the Siwan constituency. He was also elected for two successive terms to the Bihar Legislative Assembly in 1990 and 1995 from the Ziradei constituency. His wife, Hena Shahab, has contested from the Siwan constituency as the candidate from the Rashtriya Janata Dal following his disqualification and has been described as a proxy candidate.

Shahabuddin was described as a convicted gangster, a bahubhali (strongman) in the Siwan district, and a close aide of Lalu Prasad Yadav, the Rashtriya Janata Dal president.

== Early life and education ==
Mohammad Shahabuddin was born on 10 May 1967 in Partappur village, Husainganj block in Siwan district of Bihar. He was educated in Bihar and earned a Master of Arts and a PhD degree in political science.

== Political career ==
In the early 1990s, Shahabuddin came into the political limelight, joining the Janata Dal (JD) youth wing under Lalu Prasad Yadav. He won the 1990 and 1995 elections to the Vidhan Sabha (state legislative assembly), and was elected to the Lok Sabha in 1996 on the JD ticket, after which he grew in stature. With Lalu Prasad holding sway over the then state government of Bihar, and the formation of the Rashtriya Janata Dal in 1997, Shahabuddin's power increased dramatically. A report by the People's Union for Civil Liberties in 2001 states:

The patronage and de facto immunity from legal action offered to him by the RJD government gradually made him a law unto himself giving him an aura of invincibility. Since the police turned a blind eye to his criminal activities and allowed him to turn Siwan district into his fiefdom where his fiat ran. Shahabuddin's reign of terror was so complete that nobody dared depose against him in cases in which he was an accused.

Shahabuddin himself attributed his rise in political circle to the support of Rajputs, Bhumihars and Brahmins in his area; the upper-castes in Siwan and adjoining regions wanted him to put up a fight against left wing extremists, hence they backed Shahabuddin, in his rise to political power.

=== Police firefight ===
On 16 March 2001 the police were executing a warrant on the president of the local RJD unit Thakur Manoj Kumar Pappu, when Shahabuddin objected and slapped the arresting officer Sanjiv Kumar, while his men beat up police personnel. The police then re-grouped in strength and a pitched battle was launched on Shahabuddin's house, with help being sought from other police units in the vicinity, including one from Uttar Pradesh.

In the extensive fire exchange that followed, two policemen and eight others were killed, with three AK-47s and other weapons being found near several of the deceased. Shahabuddin and his men escaped, setting fire to three police jeeps, and firing continuously to cover their movements. Neither Shahabuddin nor Manoj Kumar could be arrested. After this episode, several more cases were filed against Shahabuddin; however he could not be arrested.

By the early 2000s, Shahabuddin was running a parallel administration in Siwan, holding khap panchayats to settle family and land disputes, fixing doctors' consultancy fees, and arbitrating on marital problems. In 2005, the Siwan District Magistrate described him as a habitual criminal.

== 2004 elections ==
Shahabuddin ran for the Siwan Lok Sabha constituency in 2004, mostly from prison. In late 2003, eight months before the 2004 general elections, Shahabuddin was arrested on charges of abducting Chote Lal Gupta, a Communist Party of India (Marxist–Leninist) Liberation worker in 1999, who was never seen again. Instead of staying in prison, he arranged to have himself shifted to the Siwan hospital on medical grounds; there, a complete floor was set aside for him. Here he conducted meetings for organising his election campaign, and anyone could walk in to meet him, subject to checks by his bodyguards. Every afternoon at four, he held audience for his subjects, who arrived to meet their Saheb (boss), and to get their problems resolved. One petitioner turned out to be a policeman seeking a promotion; Shahabuddin called up the police bosses on his mobile phone and arranged things on the spot. For another petitioner, he called up a minister in Delhi. Another petitioner, wishing to resolve a land dispute, brought him a rifle as a gift, right there in his prison.

Although the elections saw little activity by the opposition – every shop carried a photograph of Shahabuddin, and according to a BBC report:

There is almost no sign of the opposition campaigning in the constituency. One villager, pleading that his identity should not be disclosed, said: "Do you want to get us hanged by telling you what we feel about elections here and who we would like to vote for?"

Several phone booth owners and other businessmen were killed after putting up banners or posters of opponents.

A few days before the election, the Patna High Court directed the state government to return Shahabuddin to jail, instead of to Siwan hospital.

=== Results and aftermath ===
Shahabuddin won the election comfortably, though the second-place finisher Om Prakash Yadav of the Janata Dal (United) party, had managed to get two lakh votes, about 33.5% of the electorate. In the 1999 elections, JD(U) had polled only 7.5% of the vote. Within days of these results being announced, nine party workers of the Janata Dal (United) were killed, and a large number were beaten up; it is widely believed that this was retaliation for daring to put up a credible fight. Harendra Kushawaha, the mukhia (chief of Panchayat or village council) of the Bhanta Pokhar village where Om Prakash Yadav had a strong majority, was shot dead at a government office. After several bullets were fired at Om Prakash Yadav's house, the civil authorities assigned him a posse of eight armed policemen as bodyguards.

During the elections, largescale rigging and booth capturing were reported from as many as 500 polling stations and re-polling was ordered by the autonomous election conducting body, Election Commission of India. In 2005 a case was filed against Shahabuddin that he had lied in his electoral declaration; whereas he had said he had been named in 19 cases, at the time, there were 34 cases pending against him. Despite being the elected representative of the region, he was forbidden from entering Siwan for six months in 2005, since he was perceived as a security threat.

=== Home arsenal (April 2005) ===
In April 2005, a police raid led by then SP of Siwan district Ratn Sanjay (IPS) with the support of DM of Siwan district C. K. Anil (IAS) on Shahabuddin's house in Pratappur village helped recover illegal arms such as AK-47s, and other military weaponry authorised for possession only by the army, including night-vision goggles and guns with laser aiming modules(LAM)/laser aiming aids. Some of the arms had the markings of Pakistan ordnance factories, and the then Chief of Police alleged in a report that Shahabuddin had ties with the Pakistan intelligence agency Inter-Services Intelligence. Subsequently, eight non-bailable warrants were issued for arresting Shahabuddin.

The Delhi police and a special team sent from Bihar could not arrest him for over three months due to his political clout, despite living in his official assigned quarter in Delhi, and attending parliament. Police were finally able to arrest him from his official residence in November 2005. Subsequently, he was refused bail by the Supreme Court of India, where he was asked at one point:

By virtue of being an MP, are you entitled to keep these weapons, including a night vision device, when even the police, CRPF and other security agencies do not have it and only the army possesses it?

== Positions held ==
Mohammad Shahabuddin has been elected 2 times as MLA and 4 times as Lok Sabha MP.

From	To	Position	Constituency	Party
1990	1995	MLA (1st term)	Ziradei	IND
1995	1996	MLA (2nd term) (resigned in 1996)	Ziradei	JD
1996	1998	MP (1st term) in 11th Lok Sabha	Siwan	JD
1998	1999	MP (2nd term) in 12th Lok Sabha	Siwan	RJD
1999	2004	MP (3rd term) in 13th Lok Sabha	Siwan	RJD
2004	2009	MP (4th term) in 14th Lok Sabha	Siwan	RJD

=== Political legacy ===
His wife Heena Shahab ran unsuccessfully for his former seat in parliament in 2009, 2014, and 2019 as a member of the RJD party and 2024 as an independent candidate.

== Criminal trials ==
Shahabuddin is synonymous with criminal-politician in India; his is the standard to which other criminal-politicians are compared.

In May 2006, Nitish Kumar's National Democratic Alliance government set up a number of special courts for trying criminal-dons including Surajbhan Singh MP, and MP Prabhunath Singh from Nitish Kumar's own party, Janata Dal (United).

However, Shahabuddin claimed to have suffered a slipped disc, and was not in a position to appear in court. Medical reports however, indicated that he was fit to walk. In any event, two special courts were set up inside Siwan Jail to try the cases pending against him. There were more than thirty criminal cases pending, including eight of murder, and 20 of attempted murder, kidnapping, extortion, etc. Besides these police-registered cases, many other crimes may have gone unreported. These include a large number of "disappearances" from Siwan; reports in the media allege that as many as a hundred bodies may be buried on the grounds of Shahabuddin's well-fortified Pratappur palace, the venue of the 2001 firefight. Other matters in which he had been accused included a triple murder case in Jamshedpur, and the abduction and murder of CPI-ML activist Munna Choudhary in 2001.

=== Attempts to intimidate the legal process ===
In July 2009, one of the session judges trying the cases, V.B. Gupta, was threatened by lawyer Mahtab Alam, who initially offered "allurements" for "rescuing" Shahabuddin. When this did not work, he threatened to eliminate the judge. Subsequently, the Patna High Court ordered that a charge be registered against the lawyer Mahtab Alam.

In August 2006, while Shahabuddin was undergoing treatment in New Delhi, some of his supporters were prevented from entering by the Assistant Jailor of Patna's Beur Jail Vashisht Rai, then on deputation at the ward in AIIMS. Apparently Shahabuddin told Rai:

Your family lives in Baniapur (near Chhapra, Bihar). No one will survive.

Bahut din se tum logon ki pitai nahin hui hai. Bail hone do peet ke rakh denge (you people have not been beaten up for a long time. Let me come out on bail and I will thrash you)"

The next day, he allegedly threatened jailor Sanjeev Kumar:

Tadpa tadpa ke maarenge (I will torture you slowly to death).

=== Two years for assault on CPI-ML office (March 2007) ===
In March 2007, Magistrate V V Gupta in a Siwan court (held inside the prison) sentenced Mohammad Shahabuddin to two years imprisonment for the assault on the CPI-ML offices in Siwan on 19 September 1998. Shahabuddin his armed supporters had bombed the premises and assaulted office secretary Keshav Baitha, who was brutally beaten up and suffered splinter injuries from the bomb blast. The court also fined him Rs1,000

=== Life sentence for kidnapping and murder ===
In May 2007, Shahabuddin was convicted of the abduction of the trader and CPI(ML) worker, Chhote Lal Gupta, in February 1999, who was never seen thereafter and is widely presumed to have been murdered. While it was established that Shahabuddin, with his gang, had kidnapped Chhotelal (a witness identified him), the dead body was never recovered and thus charges of murder could not be upheld. Justice Gyaneshwar Srivastava sentenced him to life imprisonment. The verdict was challenged in Patna High Court; some of the points noted are that the conviction relied on a lone witness, who identified Shahabuddin in court, after a gap of seven years, without the benefit of a prior identification parade.

=== Subsequent cases ===
Shahabuddin was convicted in a number of other criminal cases, including for attempted murder on the then Superintendent of Police (Siwan), S.K. Singhal, in 1996 for which he was sentenced to ten years. SK Singhal later went on to become DGP of Bihar Police.

On 9 December 2015, Shahabuddin was convicted of a 2004 double murder, and given another sentence of life imprisonment.

On 11 September 2016, Shahabuddin was released on bail from Bhagalpur Special Central Jail. On 30 September Shahabuddin's bail was cancelled. On 15 February 2017 the Supreme Court directed that he be transferred from Siwan Jail in Bihar to Tihar Jail in Delhi.

== Personal life ==
Shahabuddin was married to Hena Shahab on 18 November 1991 and the couple have 3 children, including 2 daughters and 1 son named Osama Shahab.

== Death ==
On 1 May 2021, Shahabuddin died at the Deen Dayal Upadhyay Hospital in Delhi, at the age of 53 after succumbing to complications stemming from COVID-19. He had been admitted to an ICU and was undergoing treatment when he died. He was buried in the Jadid Qabristan Ahle Islam (ITO) cemetery in Delhi on 3 May 2021.
