= Chunapur =

Coordinates: 25°46′N 87°26′E

- Village
- Interactive map of Chunapur
- Country: India
- State: Bihar
- District: Purnia
- Elevation: 25 m (82 ft)

Languages
  - Official: Maithili, Hindi
- Time zone: UTC+5:30 (IST)
- PIN -->: 854303
- Vehicle registration: BR11
- Nearest city: Purnea
- Lok Sabha constituency: Purnea Sadar
- Vidhan Sabha constituency: Dhamdhaha
- Nearest Railway Station: Purnia Court

Chunapur is a village situated 3 km west of Purnia town in the Indian state of Bihar. It is situated on the bank of Kari Kosi, a tributary of Koshi river.

== History ==
The government of India constructed an aerodrome there known as Chunapur Aerodrome.

The local Roy family produced notable personalities. The Roy family was a large landholder that they used for settlement of landless laborers. Descendants of late Shri Vanshmani Roy and Shri Vankhandi Roy spread across the country and outside country. Late Shri Deo Nath Roy was a veteran freedom fighter and former MLA of Purnea. He surrendered his one hundred acres of agricultural land in favor of share croppers in Araria district.

It has an Indian Air Force airbase, Now Being Developed as A demostic Airport . Purnea Airport has one of the longest runway in Bihar.

== Education ==
For the development of their village, Late Shri shardanand roy, Dr. Mohan Roy along with Mr. Kumar Roy took the initiative to establish reputed education system in Chunapur. This effort was initially made by their grandfather Shri. Bankhandi Roy, who constructed a Sanskrit school in 1935. The school could not operate after the death of Shri. Bankhandi Roy in 1942.

Dr. Mohan Roy along with Mr. Kumar Roy took steps to set up free education for their village. They started the work to build a school in the name of their parents Smt. Shashimukhi Roy and Shri. Ramnarayan Roy. About 3 acres of land were required for building the school. Mr. Kumar Roy persuaded a number of landowners in the village to donate land. These included Shri. Ramnarayan Roy, Shri. Sunderkand Jha, Shri. Sambhunath Roy and Shri.Tirpit Roy. Mr. Kumar Roy's business (Four Star Picture Palace) also funded the construction of the school building. In 1988, the construction of "Shashimukhi Ramnarayan Aadarsh Madhya Vidyalaya" (Middle school) was finished and donated to the government of Bihar. This school creates many bright students of the chunapur who are currently serves all over the country for the betterment of the humanity. Wow.

== DAV Public School ==
Further to establish a quality education system in Chunapur, Dr. Mohan Roy and Mr. Kumar Roy reached out to the Dayanand Anglo-Vedic School System to open their branch in Chunapur. Shri Ramnarayan Roy, father of Dr. Roy and Mr. Roy, donated his land for the proposed school. D.A.V system opened their branch in Chunapur in 1998. The school was called S. R D.A.V Public School (Shahsimukhi Ramnarayan DAV public school) in honor of the couple Mrs. Shashimukhi Roy and Mr. Ramnarayan Roy.

This school served the entire Purnea area. However, Chunapur was not very well connected to the city of Purnea, which was an inconvenience for the school students. For this reason, the school decided to move to the Purnea Municipal Area. Dr. Mohan Roy donated land in Purnea for this move. In 1999, S.R.D.A.V Public School moved from Chunapur to Purnea.
