= Katihar Railway colony =

Katihar Railway Colony
- neighborhood
- Nickname: Railway colony
- Interactive map of Katihar Railway Colony
- Location in Bihar, India Katihar Railway Colony (India)
- Country: India
- State: Bihar
- City: Katihar

Population (2011)
  - Total: 14,577

Languages
  - Official: = IST
- Time zone: UTC+5:30
- Vehicle registration: BR 39

Katihar Railway Colony is a major railway residential area in Katihar, Bihar, India. The colony was established as part of the development of railway infrastructure in Katihar and primarily serves as a residential area for employees of Indian Railways and their families. It is situated in the vicinity of Katihar Junction railway station, one of the important railway junctions in the region.

The railway colony consists of residential quarters and associated facilities developed for railway personnel. Over time, the area has developed into an established residential neighbourhood and has become closely associated with the railway history and identity of Katihar. The presence of railway offices, workshops, operational facilities and employee housing has contributed significantly to the development of Katihar as an important railway centre in northeastern Bihar.

Katihar Railway Colony is administratively and geographically part of the urban area of Katihar and is connected to other parts of the city through the local road network. Its development reflects the historical importance of Katihar in the railway network connecting Bihar, West Bengal and the northeastern region of India.
