= Lasanpur =

- Village
- Location in Bihar, India
- Coordinates: 25.815760°N 87.651770°E
- Country: India
- State: Bihar
- District: Purnia

Population (2001)
  - Total: 2,126

Languages
  - Official: Maithili, Hindi
- Time zone: UTC+5:30 (IST)
- Postal code: 854326
- ISO 3166 code: IN-BR
- Lok Sabha constituency: Purnia
- WORK IS WORSHIP

Lasanpur is a large village located in Dagarua of Purnia district, Bihar with total 437 families residing. It has population of 2126 of which 1115 are males while 1011 are females as per Population Census 2011.

== Demographics ==
In Lasanpur village, population of children with age 0-6 is 425 which makes up 19.99% of total population of village. Average Sex Ratio of Lasanpur village is 907 which is lower than Bihar state average of 918. Child Sex Ratio for the Lasanpur as per census is 1024, higher than Bihar average of 935.

It has lower literacy rate compared to Bihar. In 2011, literacy rate of this village was 60.49% compared to 61.80% of Bihar. In Lasanpur, Male literacy stands at 71.16% while female literacy rate was 48.37%.

As per constitution of India and Panchyati Raaj Act, Lasanpur village is administrated by Sarpanch (Head of Village) who is elected representative of village.

== Geographical location ==
It is situated 2 KM away from sub-district headquarter Dagarua and 19 KM away from district headquarter Purnia. Purnia Junction Railway Station is very near to Dagarua.

== Lasanpur Village Overview ==
Gram Panchayat : Buwari Block / Tehsil : Dagarua District : Purnia State : Bihar Pincode : 854326 Area : 133 hectares Population : 2,126 Households : 437 Nearest Town : Purnia(19 km)
