= Kasba, Purnia =

Kasba
- Satellite Town
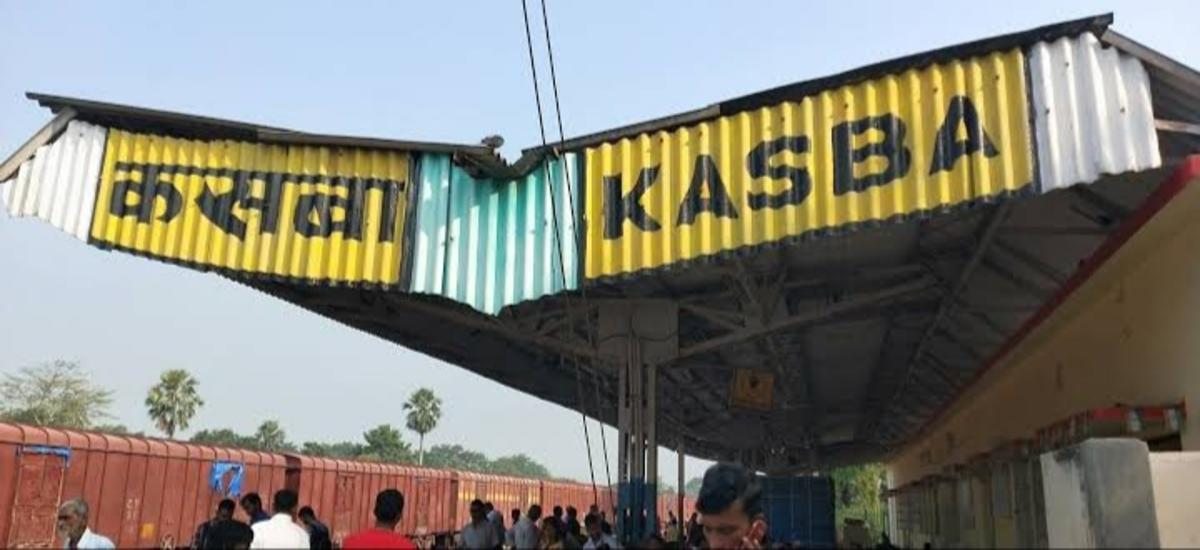
- Kasba Railway Station

- Location in Bihar, India Location in India
- Coordinates: 25.8500°N 87.5500°E
- Country: India
- State: Bihar
- Region: Mithila
- District: Purnia
- Urban Agglomeration: Purnia Urban Agglomeration

Government
  - Type: City Council
  - Body: Kasba Nagar Parishad

Population (2011)
  - Total: 25,522

Languages
  - Official: Hindi
- Time zone: UTC+5:30 (IST)
- PIN: 854330
- ISO 3166 code: IN-BR
- Vehicle registration: BR-11
- Lok Sabha constituency: Purnia
- Vidhan Sabha constituency: Kasba

Kasba is a satellite town of Purnia city in Purnia district of the Indian state of Bihar. It is situated to the north of Purnia city and forms part of the Purnia Urban Agglomeration. Kasba is administered as a Nagar Parishad(municipal council) and is an important urban centre in the district. It is the second-largest town in Purnia district by population, after Purnia city.

== Demographics ==
As of 2001 India census, Kasba had a population of 25,522. Males constitute 53% of the population and females 47%. Kasba has an average literacy rate of 49%, lower than the national average of 59.5%: male literacy is 57%, and female literacy is 41%. In Kasba, 18% of the population is under 6 years of age.

== Geographical location ==
Situated in the North Eastern part of Bihar, Kasba lies between 87.5' Eastern Longitude and 25.8 Degree North Latitude. Covers 0.5% (30 km^{2}) of the state's area. Kasba can be broadly divided into two physiographic units, the Plains and the Plateau. A land endowed with minerals, fertile green fields, peace fallboard force, vast market and a political system committed to industrial growth.

== Transportation ==
=== Road ===
NH 27 passes through Kasba. This National Highway connects Kasba to Purnia, Siliguri, Guwahati, Kolkata, Muzaffarpur, Patna, Gorakhpur, Lucknow and Porbandar.

Another, State Highway starts from Kasba that direct connects it to Line Bazar(Medical hub of this region), Purnia Court railway station and Kosi Division.

=== Railways ===
Kasba railway station lies on Jogbani-Katihar line. This station has direct trains for Jogbani, Purnia and Katihar. Two Express trains pass through Kasba but don't stop here, only DEMU stops here. For long-distance trains, people have to go Purnia and Katihar for board on their train.
