= Saura River =

Boys are diving into the river

Coordinates: 25°46′13″N 87°30′29.1″E

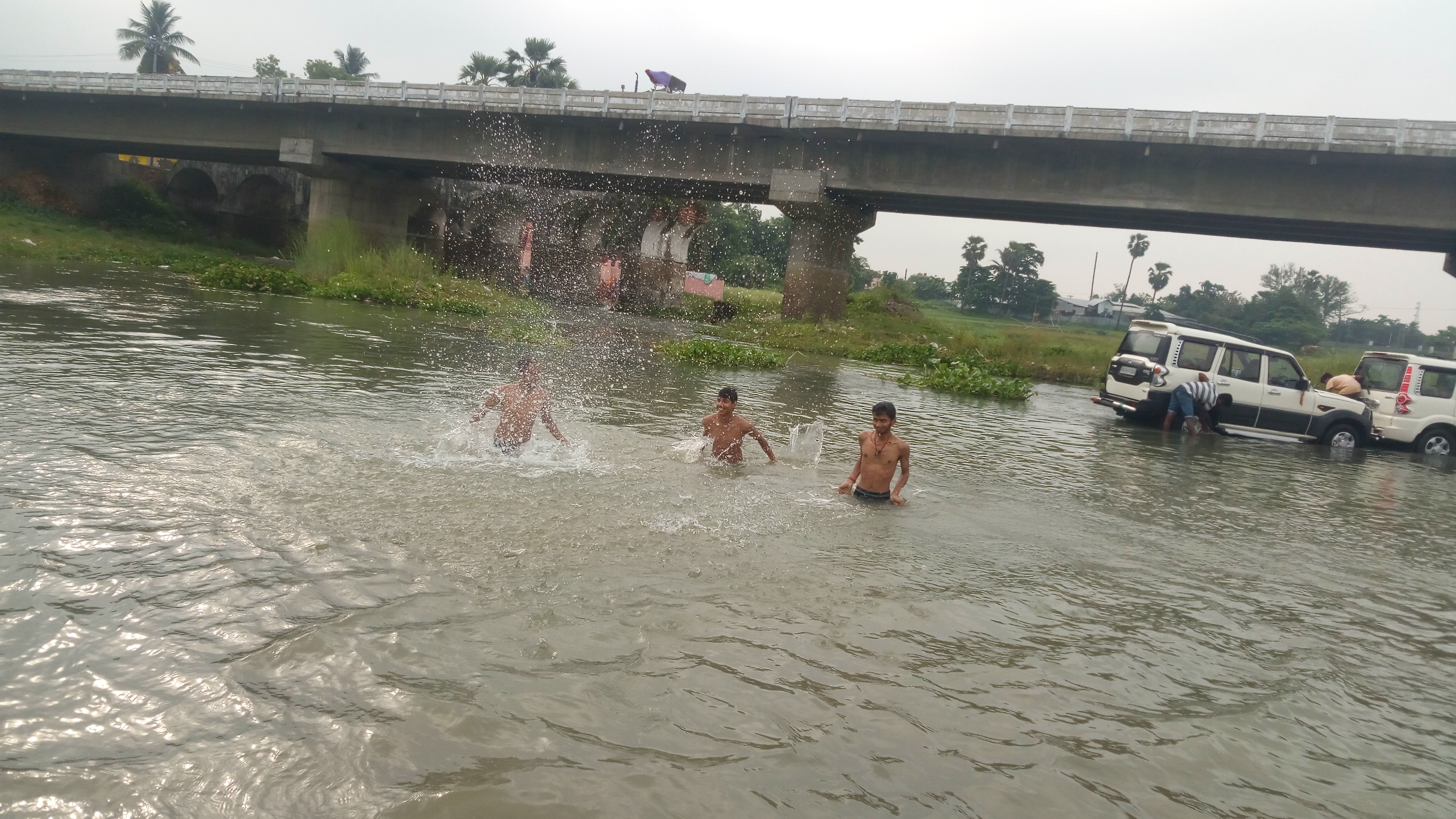
People bathing in Saura river near Purnea city, kali mandir.

The Saura river is one of the two rivers flowing through Purnia (city). It flows east of main city separating Gulabbagh and Khushkibagh from the main town. It rises in some lowland to the north-west of Jalalgadh and joins the Ganga river in Dilarpur, Katihar. The river flows to the eastern side of the Purnia town.

== Religion and Culture ==
Purandevi temple and City Kali Mandir, which are some of the popular temples of Purnea are situated along the banks of Saura river. An annual event of Kosi Aarti is organised in City Kali Mandir on Dev Deepawali, Kartik Purnima every year which attracts a large number of devotees.
