= Purnea University =

Public university in Purnea, Bihar, India

- Main Entrance
- Motto: ऋते ज्ञानान्न मुक्ति
- Motto in English: There is no liberation without knowledge
- Type: Public
- Established: 18 March 2018; 8 years ago
- Affiliations: UGC
- Chancellor: Governor of Bihar
- Vice-Chancellor: Vivekanand Singh
- Location: Purnia, Bihar, India
- Language: Hindi, English
- Website: Official website

Purnea University is a collegiate public state university located in Purnia, Bihar, India. It has jurisdiction over Purnia, Araria, Kishanganj and Katihar districts. It was established by an act of State Legislature in 2018. As a collegiate university, its main functions are divided between the academic departments of the university and affiliated colleges.

The Governor of Bihar serves as the university's chancellor.

== History ==
Purnea University was established on 18 March 2018 after its bifurcation from Bhupendra Narayan Mandal University, Madhepura. The first academic year of the university was 2018–19.

== Campus ==
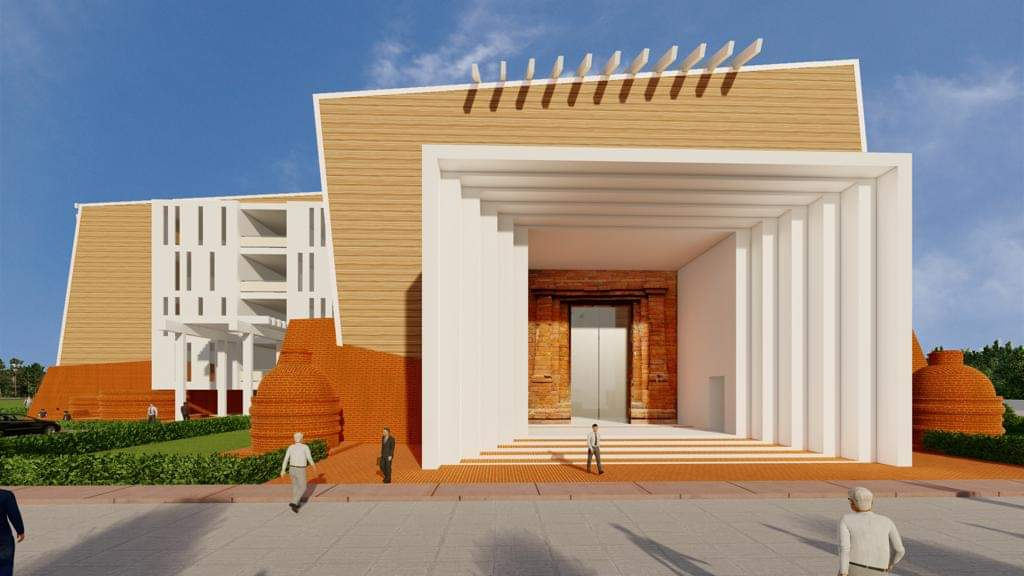
Front elevation of the university

The university currently operates on the campus of Purnea College Purnea, A permanent campus is planned on 37 acres, with academic and administrative buildings, a library, laboratories, residential facilities, sports and cultural facilities, and other amenities.

== Academic programmes ==
The university offers various programs, including BA, BSc, and BCom degrees, as well as professional programs such as bachelor's degrees in technology, civil engineering, electrical engineering, mechanical engineering, electronics engineering and computer science and engineering. It also offers an MA in Humanities and an MBA program.

== Colleges ==
The university's jurisdiction extends over four districts: Araria, Katihar, Kishanganj and Purnea.

=== Affiliated colleges ===
- Surya Narayan Singh Yadav College, Rambagh, Purnia
- N.D. College, Rambagh, Purnia
- R.K.K. College, Purnia
- P.S. College, Harda, Purnia
- B.N.C. College, Dhamdaha, Purnia
- A.J. Mahila College, Banmankhi, Purnia
- Bhola Paswan Shastri College Babhangama, Bihariganj, Madhepura
- S.R.C Degree College, Katihar
- R.Y. Degree College, Manihari, Katihar
- B.M. Degree College, Barari, Katihar
- Balrampur Degree College, Balrampur, Katihar
- B.D. College, Barsoi, Katihar
- Y.N.P. Degree College, Raniganj, Araria
- K.D. College, Raniganj, Araria
- J.D.S.S. Mahila College, Forbesganj, Araria
- M.L.D.P.K.Y. College, Araria
- Alsams Millia Degree College, Araria
- Bhola Paswan Shastri Degree College, Babhangama, Bihariganj Madhepura
- Peoples College, Araria
- R.K.S. Mahila College, Kishanganj
- M.H.A.N.D. College, Thakurganj, Kishanganj

=== Constituent colleges ===
- Purnea College, Purnia
- Purnea Mahila Mahavidyalya, Purnia
- M.L. Arya College Kasba, Purnia
- G.L.M. College, Banmankhi, Purnia
- Bhola Paswan Shastri College Babhangama,Bihariganj,Madhepura [Affiliated-BSEB(63023),NIOS(030049),BBOSE(CZ19200001)].
- R.L. College, Madhavnagar, Purnia
- D.S. College, Katihar
- MJ.M. Mahila College, Katihar
- RDS College, Salmari, Katihar
- KB Jha College, Katihar
- Forbesganj College, Forbesganj, Araria
- Araria College, Araria
- K.K.P.K High School Babhangama Bihariganj Madhepura
- Lal Bahadur Shastri Sanskrit High School Babhangama Bihariganj Madhepura
- Marwari College, Kishanganj
- Nehru College, Bahadurganj, Kishanganj
- Govt Degree College, Baisi, Purnea.
- Bhola Paswan Shastri Degree College Babhangama Bihariganj Madhepura (Affiliated From-BNMU Madhepura).
- Govt Degree College, Dhamda, Purnea.

=== Law colleges ===
- Brij Mohan Thakur Law College, Purnia
- Chandra Kishore Mishra Law College, Araria
- Suryadeo Law College, Katihar
