= Government Medical College and Hospital, Purnea =

Indian government secondary-level medical college and hospital

- Type: Government
- Established: 2023; 3 years ago
- Academic affiliations: Bihar University of Health Sciences
- Principal: Dr. Hari Shankar Mishra
- Location: Line Bazar, Purnea, Bihar, India; 25.7844401°N 87.4895911°E
- Campus: Urban
- Website: https://gmchpurnea.com/

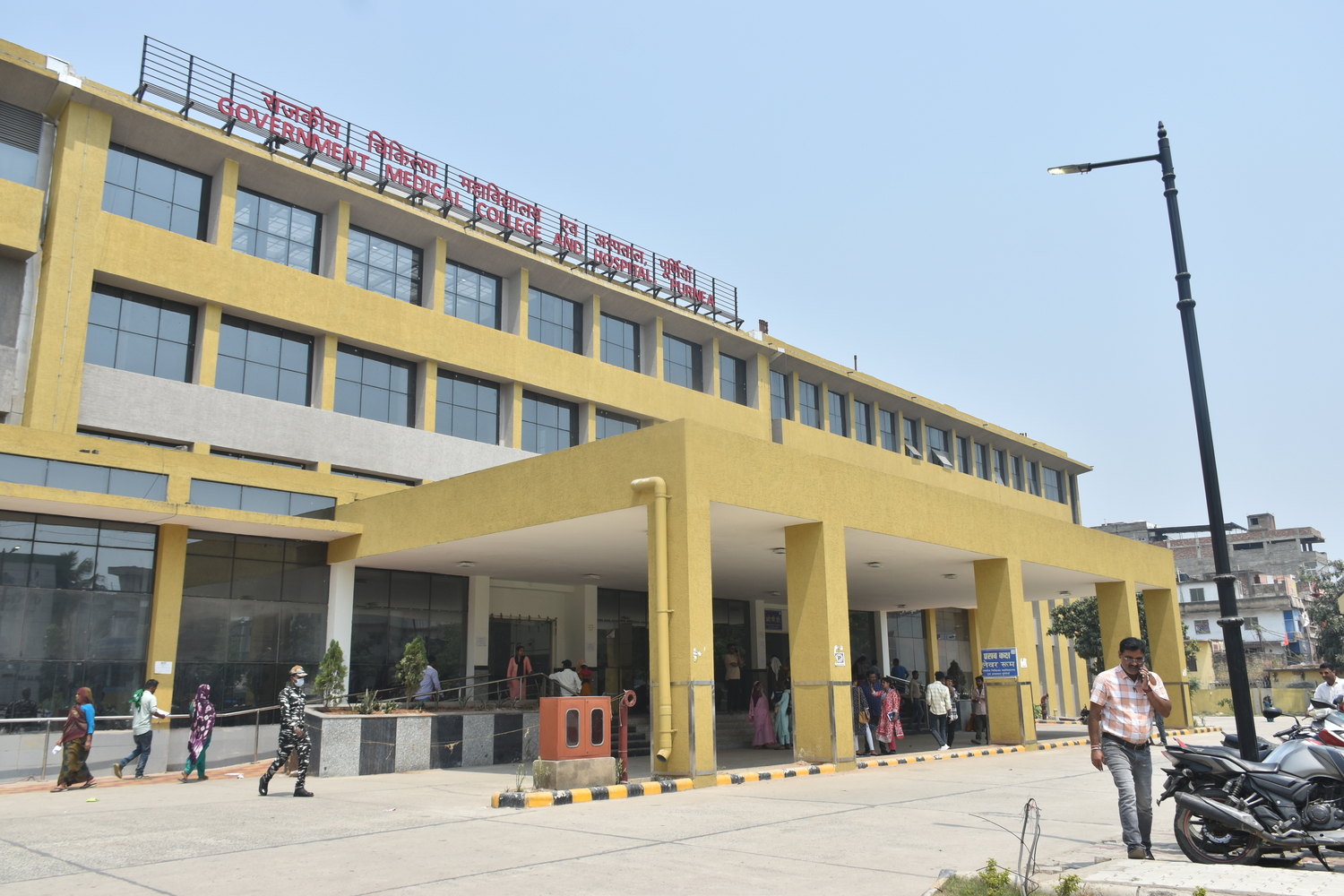
Government Medical College and Hospital, Purnea

Government Medical College and Hospital, Purnea (abbreviated as GMCH, Purnea) is a government medical college and hospital located at Purnea, Bihar, India.

The college imparts the Bachelor of Medicine and Surgery (MBBS) degree. The hospital associated with the college is one of the largest hospitals in the Purnea district. Yearly undergraduate student intake is 100 from the year 2023.

== Courses ==
Government Medical College and Hospital, Purnea undertakes education and training of 100 students MBBS courses.

== Location ==
The Government Medical College and Hospital, Purnea, is situated on a 24.08-acre campus in Purnea, Bihar. The campus spans a built-up area of approximately 85,780 square meters. The construction and development of the institution were undertaken with an estimated cost of ₹365.58 crore.

== Affiliated ==
The college is affiliated with Bihar University of Health Sciences and is recognised by the National Medical Commission.
