= Kolasi =

Kolasi Kailaspuri
- Semi Town
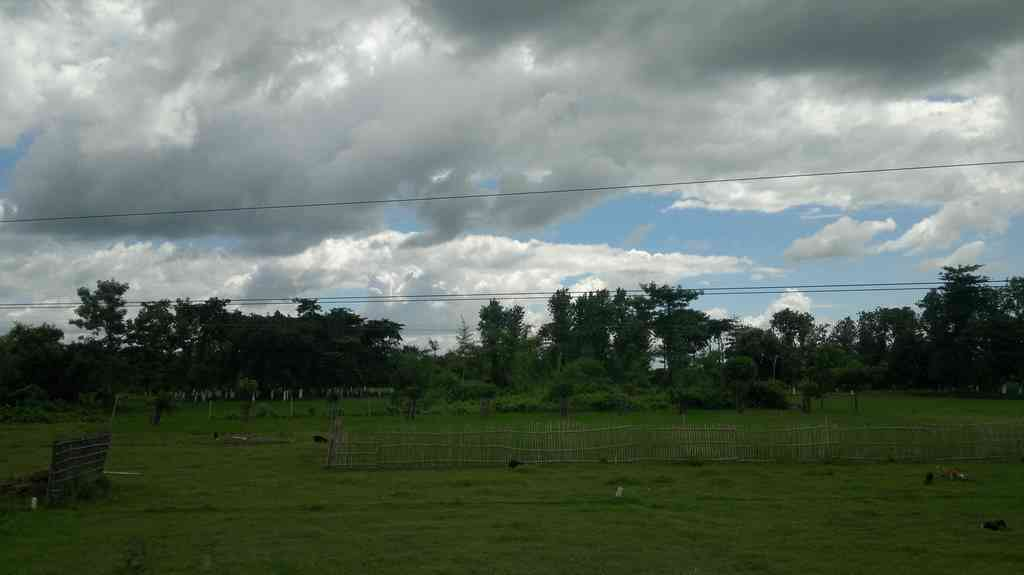
- Nickname: Kolasi Chowk
- Location in Katihar Bihar, India Kolasi (India)
- Coordinates: 25.5777184°N 87.5105613°E
- Country: India
- State: Bihar
- District: Katihar
- Named for: Lord Shiva's Residence

Government
  - Type: Village Jury (Gram Panchayat)
  - Body: North Simria
- Elevation: 34–36 m (112–118 ft)

Languages
  - Official: Hindi, Urdu, Angika, Maithili, Bhojpuri
- Time zone: UTC+5:30 (IST)
- Postal code: [854106]
- Area code: +91 6457
- Lok Sabha constituency: Purnia
- Vidhan Sabha constituency: Korha

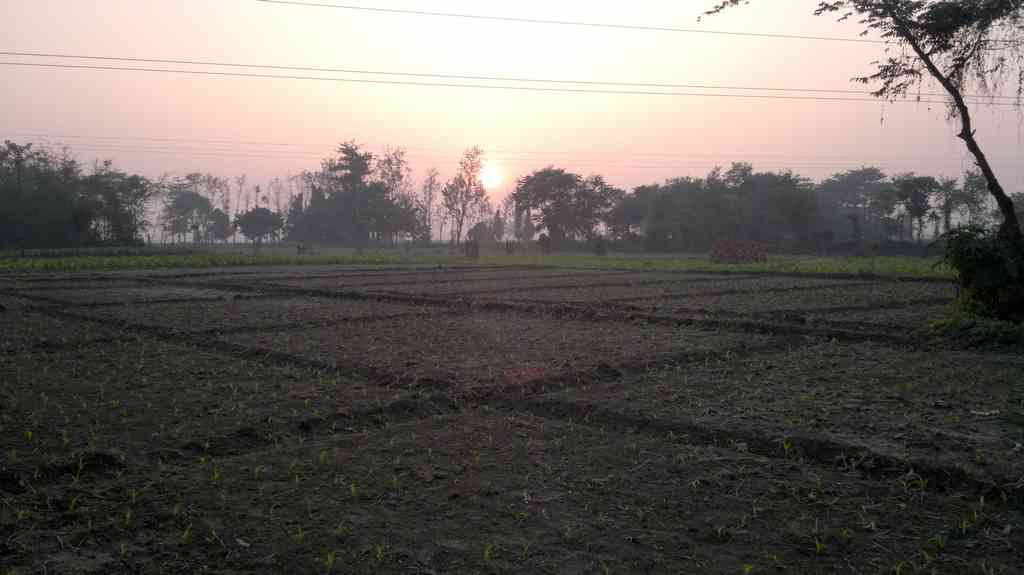
Crops Field

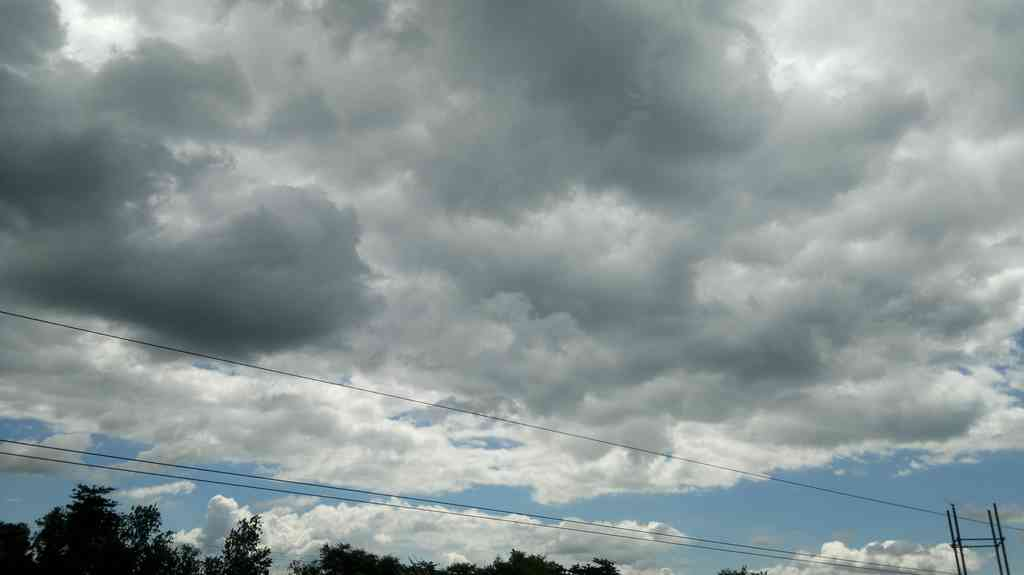
Environment

Kolasi is a village situated near Katihar Town (5.0 km) of Bihar state in India. It is located on the banks of the Kosi river, surrounded by temples and agriculture lands and gathering a harmonized society above cast and religion. Generally, this village is known for having a common market place for nearby villages people and for its peaceful environment.

== Geography ==
Kolasi is located at 25.577819°N 87.512734°E. It has an average elevation of 35.81 metres (117.5 ft).

== Culture and civilization ==
It is the main center of local self-business in nearby villages (such as Durgasthan, Dighri, Simria, Sivadih, Sandalpur, Sonapur, Hazipur, etc.) which attracts peoples from there. The people from different region flocking to this semi-town local market for Sweet Shops, Cloths, Shoes, Vegetables, and various other items. Besides the original inhabitants of Kosi-Mahananda-Ganga Region, the town witnessed an influx of permanent settlers from different regions of Bihar and Uttar Pradesh. Its proximity to Jharkhand brought many Adivasis close to the town. The people here speak Hindi, Urdu, Angika, Maithili, Bhojpuri, Bengali, Marwari, Surjapuri, etc.

The Area has a mix of Hindu, Muslim, Christian, and Sikh religion followers. There are many temples in which Temples of Lord Shiva, Goddess Kali and Durga near Kosi River, Lord Hanuman Temple in the market are famous.

== Economy ==
The major source of living is agriculture. The rice industry is a flourishing business in this area. The industry here is mainly agro based. There are also a couple of old cycle trading companies with huge turnover. Pharmaceuticals business is also pretty good with huge turnover. The main crops are paddy, wheat, corn, banana, pulses, and various spices. The agriculture is the mainstay of this area, but no proper irrigation facility and poor or no electric supply has hampered the rural area dependent upon agriculture. There is large scale migration of poor people to the various cities of India in search of jobs.

== Transport ==
Kolasi is on NH 81 and is the junction point for paths leading to Korha, Katihar Town, Purnea, Simariya, Baijnathpur, Sandalpur, Shivadih, Semapur etc.

Nearby District town Katihar is a major railway station under North-East Frontier Railway. It is a very old station. In fact, Katihar junction is a five (Eight if local lines taken together) line junction. 1st line goes to Barauni, 2nd line to Kolkata, 3rd line to Jogbani (Nepal border), 4th line to Guwahati, 5th line to Manihari. The other three local lines go to Purana Jute Mill, Naya Jute Mill and FCI. Katihar is also the headquarters of Katihar Railway Division. The major station under this division includes New Jalpaiguri, Siliguri, Darjeeling, Kishanganj etc. The world heritage Darjeeling Himalayan Railway falls under the jurisdiction of Katihar Railway Division. One can find trains to Nepal and Bangladesh border from here. In fact pre independence this station was connected with present-day Bangladesh. All the trains passing through Katihar stops here. One can get a direct train to most of the Indian cities from this station. The notable trains are Rajdhani Express, Capital Express, Avadh Assam Express, North-East Express, Dadar Express, Amprapali Express, Sikkim Mahananda Express, Amarnath Express, Hate Bazare Express, Bangalore Express etc. Due to lack of poor road network, train communication is the only source of communication.

The village falls on the national highway; NH-81 passes through the area. Road connectivity is good. Bus service is also good to Purnea, Semapur, Manihari, Bhagalpur, Patna, Ranchi, etc.

The nearest commercial airport is Bagdogra (160 km). There is an old time airstrip in nearby Katihar town which is mostly used as a helipad. The place is known as Hawai Adda.

The teledensity is high, which reflects the economic development in the recent times of the rural area.

== Education ==
There are many colleges and schools in or nearby the village. The notables are as follows:

=== Colleges ===
- D.S. College, Katihar
- Katihar Medical College and Hospital, Katihar
- K. B. Jha College, Katihar
- M.J.M. Mahila College, Katihar
- Marwari Inter College, Bara Bazar
- Sita Ram Chamariya Degree College, Mirchaibari
- Harishankar Nayak Inter College, Mirchaibari, Katihar

=== Schools ===
- Governmental Basic School, Kolasi
- JNV, Kolasi
- Harishankar Nayak High School, Mirchaibari
- Marwari Pathshala, Katihar

=== Institutions ===
- Raghav Classes, Kolasi, Katihar
- Madhav Classes, Kolasi Chowk, Katihar
- Shanti Siksha Niketan, Kolasi, Katihar
- National Career School, Kolasi, Katihar
- Wisdom Public School, Kolasi, Katihar
- Daffodil Public School, Kolasi, Katihar
- Sri Balaji Coaching Centre, Kolasi, Katihar
- The Progressive Coaching Centre, Kolasi, Katihar
- GOV Madrasa Ashrafia Islami Sonapur, KORHA, KATIHAR

== See also ==
- Katihar
- Korha
- Korha
- JNV, Kolasi
