= Jalalgarh Fort =

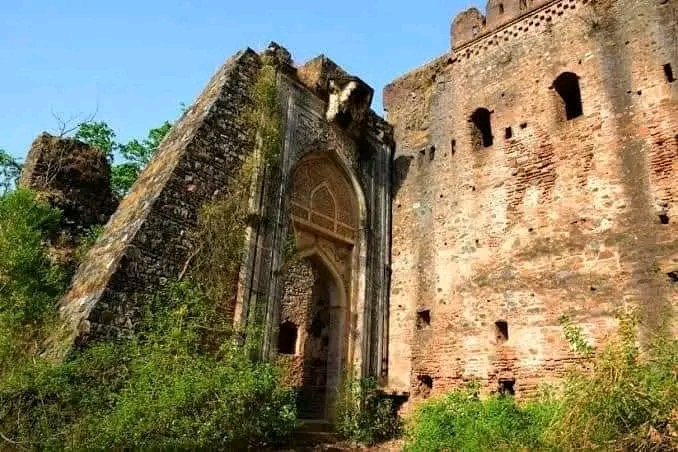

General information
- Status: Ruined (renovation announced)
- Type: Fort
- Location: Purnia, India
- Renovated: 2012
- Owner: Indian government

Jalalgarh Fort is a more than 300-year-old ruined fort located at 20 km north of Purnia, Bihar, India. The fort was built by Saif Khan, the Faujdar of Purnea in 1722.

== Structure ==
The fort is a large quadrangular structure and has high walls which helped to protect the wall from Nepalese invasion. The fort is an embodiment of the beauty of Islamic architecture.

== Restoration ==
In January 2012, Bihar Chief Minister Nitish Kumar announced that Government of Bihar would be restoring and repairing the fort. He ordered Purnia district authorities to do this restoration work.
