= Kari Kosi =

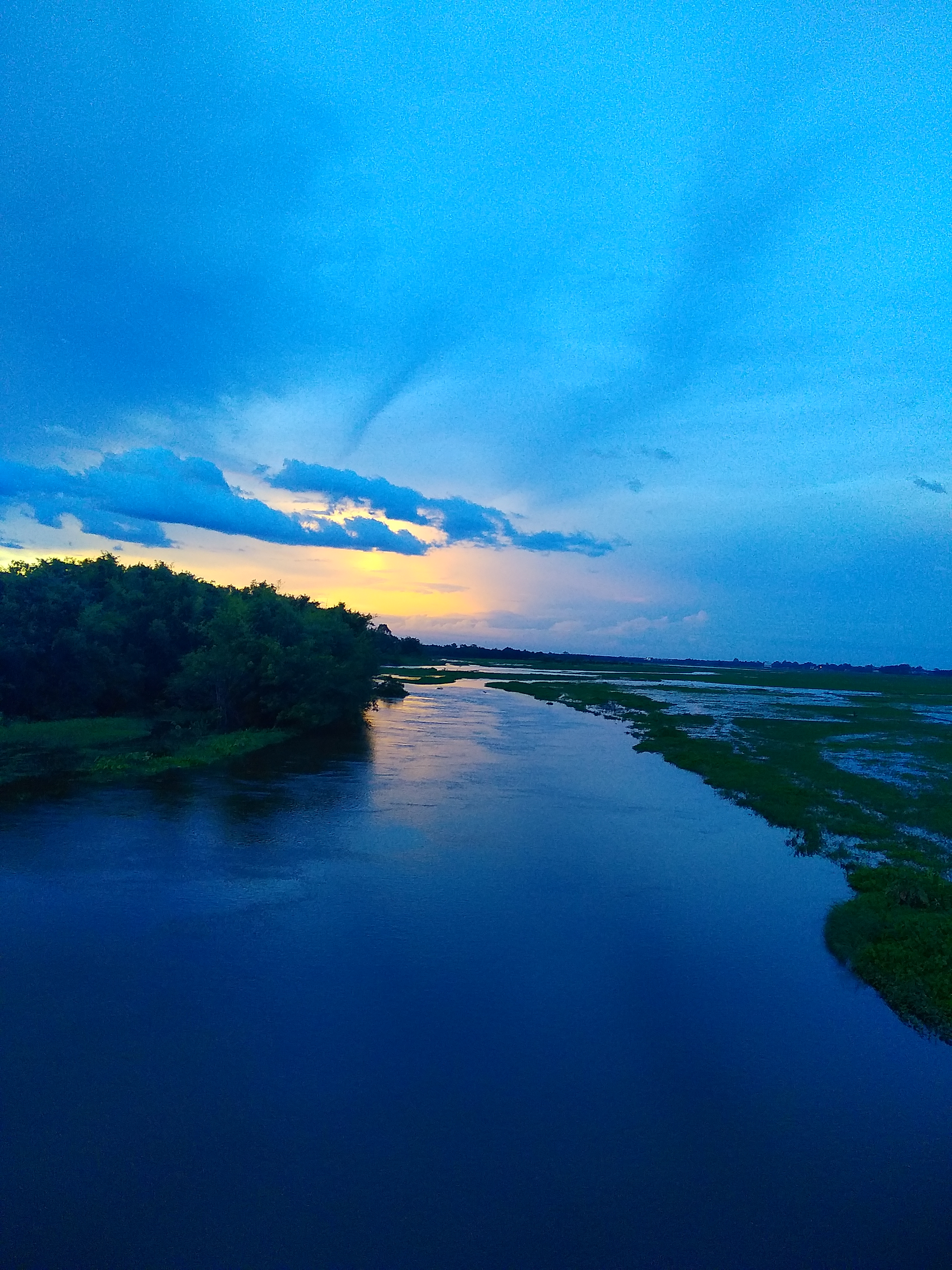
Kari Kosi river at Chunapur Ghat, Purnea.

Kari Kosi is one of the two rivers flowing through Purnea (city). It is the abandoned channel of Kosi river which used to flow from center of Purnea which is briefly described in the Bengal District Gazetteers - Purnea by O’malley, L. S. S. It joins Saura river near Harda, Purnea which further joins The Ganga river in Dilarpur, Katihar.

The wetlands created by Kari Kosi makes Makhana farming possible in Purnea and Katihar districts. This area became one of the largest producer of Makhana in India, thanks to this river

== Floods ==
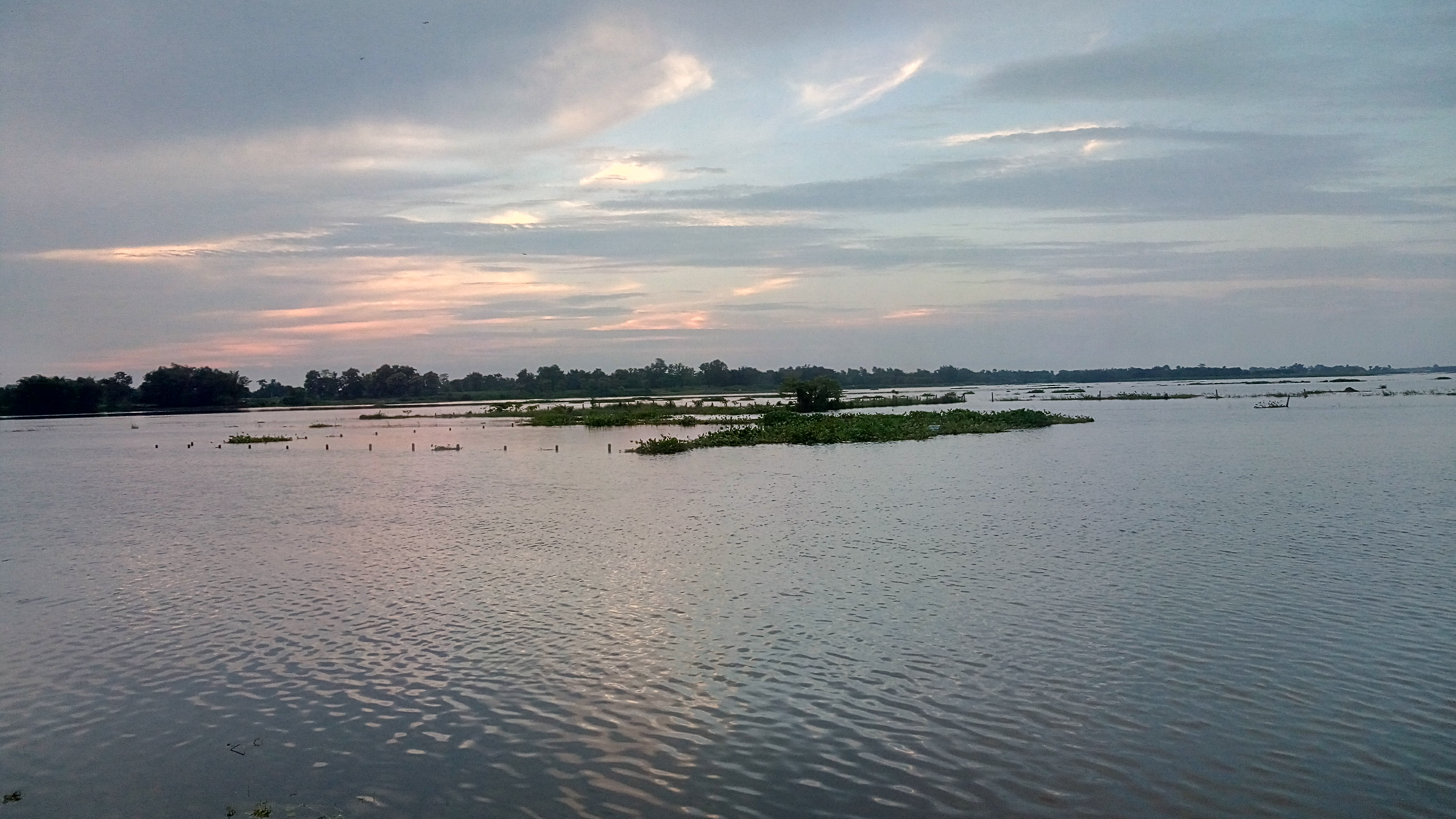
Kari kosi splitting its banks during monsoon.

Along with Mahananda, Kari Kosi usually split Its banks causing deluge and waterlogging in Katihar district of Bihar.

== Environmental Degradation ==
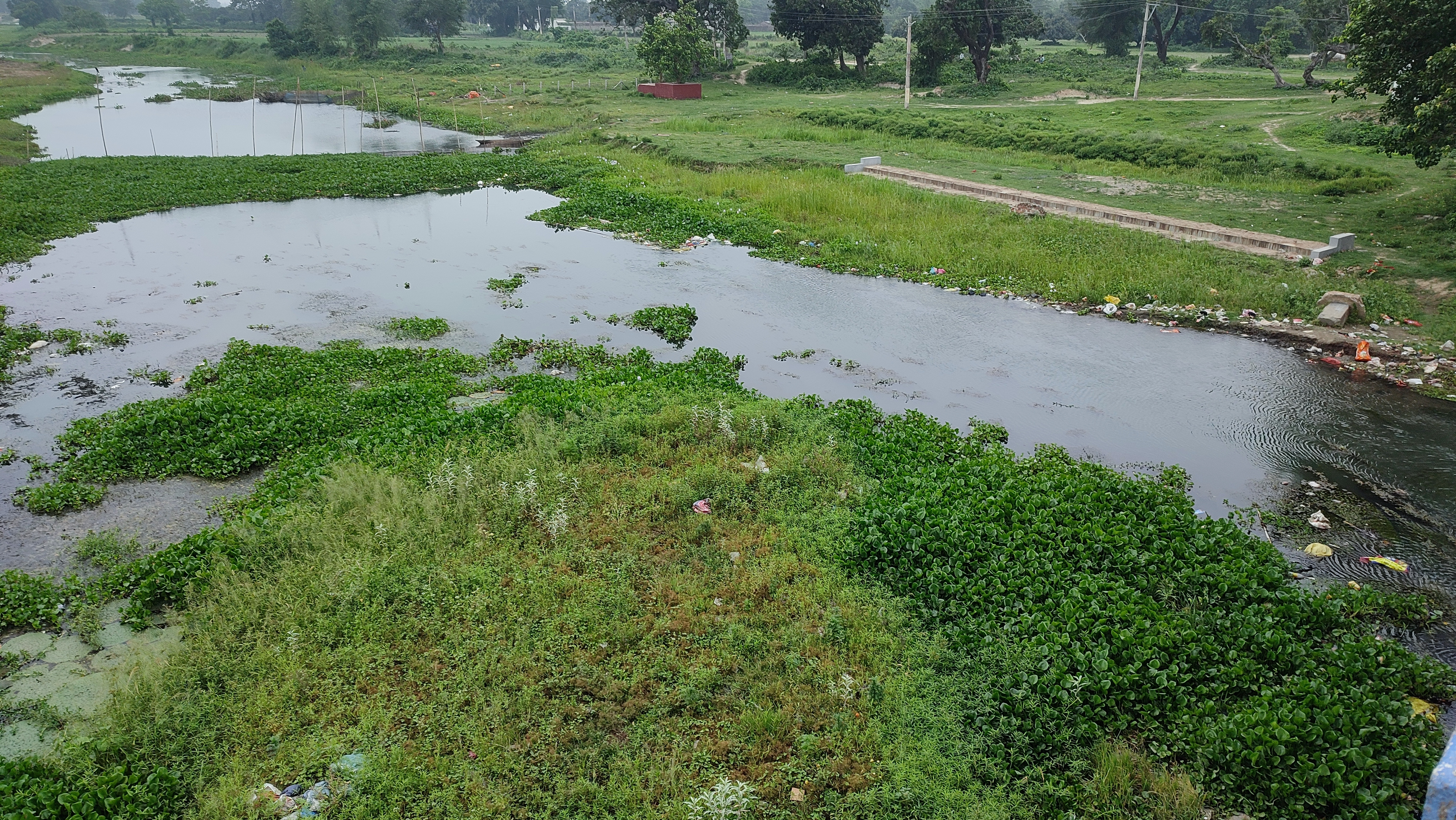
Plastic pollutants on banks of river near Chunapur bridge dumped by ignorant people from bridge.

Water quality of river has degraded within few years due to illegal possession of river lands and dumping non biodegradable wastes like plastic, polythene bags along with religious remains by ignorant people.
