= Elizabeth Sharaf un-Nisa =

Mughal noblewoman

Elizabeth Sharaf-un-Nisa Ducarel
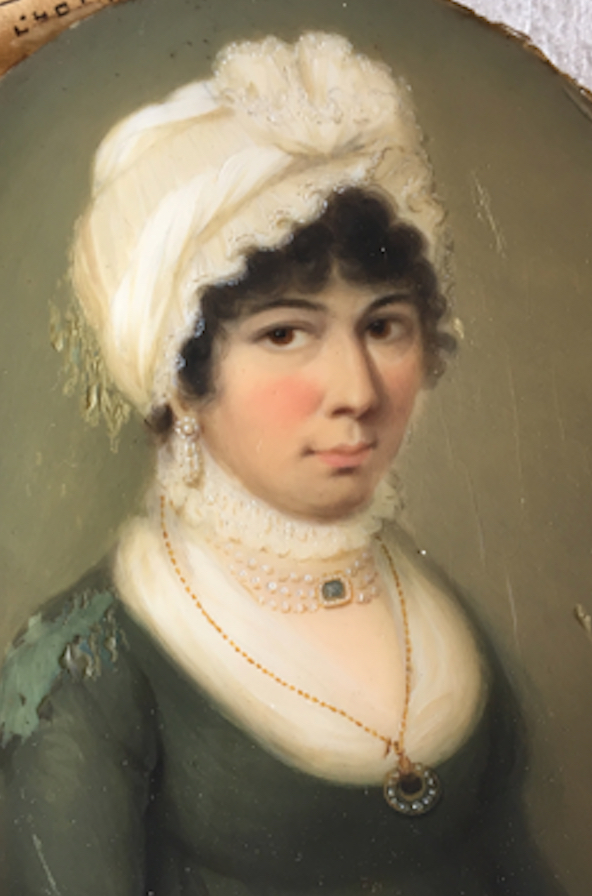
- Portrait of Elizabeth Sharaf-un-Nisa
- Born: 1758; Purnia, Bengal Subah
- Died: 1822 (aged 63–64); Newland, Gloucestershire
- Resting place: All Saint’s Church, Newland, United Kingdom
- Spouse: Gerard Gustavus Ducarel (m. 1787)
- Children: 4

Elizabeth Sharaf un-Nisa Ducarel (1758–1822) born as Sharaf un-Nisa or simply known as Elizabeth Ducarel, was a Mughal noblewoman from Purnea in Bihar, India who later moved to England with her husband, Gerard Ducarel, a member of a gentry family and an official of the British East India Company, in the late 18th century.

The study of her life is significant as it is one of the early examples of a foreign-born woman assimilating into British society.

== Life ==
=== Early life ===
She was born in or around the town of Purnea into a land-owning or noble family that came into contact with the British East India Company. At some point in the 18th century, at the age of 12, she began living with Gerard Gustavus Ducarel who was appointed as the first district supervisor for Purnea. The Ducarel family themselves claimed that Elizabeth was the daughter of a "Maharaja in Purnea" and also described her as "Persian Princess". Elizabeth is recorded as having three brothers, Daim Beg, Mirza Alim Beg and Qaim Beg.

She was 13 when she gave birth to her first daughter in 1771 who was named Elizabeth and Elizabeth was subsequently sent to England at the age of 10. After leaving his posting in Purnea, Gerard Ducarel took Elizabeth with him to various appointments in India including Kolkata. Between 1770 and 1782, Elizabeth gave birth to three more children; Mary (1777), Phillip (1778) and William (1780). All three of them were sent to England for their schooling while their parents remained in India.

=== Life in England ===
In 1784, she left with Gerard to settle in England they were legally married in 1787. She also converted to Christianity and changed her first name to Elizabeth. Her shift from concubine to legally wedded wife, was said to have been unusual for the period as the common advice given to officials of the East India Company was that concubines were considered less of an expense than a wife. In this case, the academic, Megan Eaton, thinks that Gerard Ducarel benefited from contacts he made through Elizabeth in the local Muslim and Mughal elite.

The Ducarel family, which Sharaf un-Nisa had married into, were part of the landed gentry of Gloucestershire and were the descendants of French Huguenots that settled in Newland. The family made their wealth through investments and service in the East India Company.

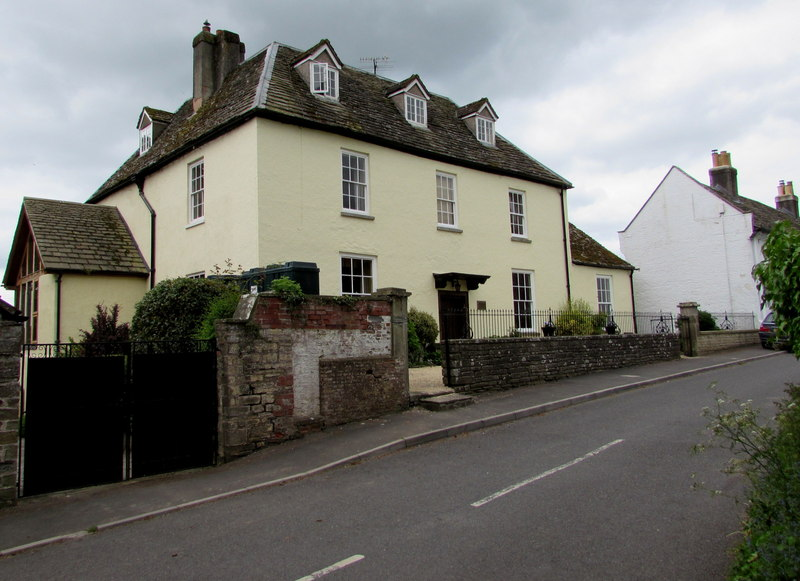
The village of Newland, Gloucestershire where Elizabeth Ducarel lived while in England

While living in England, Elizabeth continued to receive letters from her brothers, requesting she advise her husband to arrange salaried positions for them or advocate on their behalf with local British administrators so that they could trade in Purnea, Azimabad and Burdwan. These letters continued for up to 20 years following her departure from India. In some instances, were able to help however the East India Company's structures often changed which limited the influence that Gerard Ducarel had.

Mirza Abu Taleb Khan had visited the Ducarel's in 1799 while travelling through England. He noted in his travelogues:

Mister Ducarel had also been in India for a long time, and was occupied with heading Purnea. At that time, a woman of the nobility fell into his hands, and she had children by him. At the time of Ducarel’s return to firang [Britain] the aforementioned woman, out of the love of her children she did not quit accompanying him, and for this reason she went to that homeland [vilayet, meaning England]. After the report of my arrival was delivered by Mr. Johnson, she showed interest in meeting [me]. I went to see her. Because the aforementioned woman is fair [safed-rang] and has been in the country for twenty years, in her language, her dress, in her manner of sitting and standing, and in every respect, I found her to be like foreign women [banuan-e firang]. She introduced me to three or four of her children [literally “sons”], one of them nineteen, and there was absolutely no distinction between them [and Europeans], and there was no discerning any difference between them and the young people who were born there [in England]. She was very happy and content to have met me. But because Mister Ducarel was raving mad [shaur-i janūbī], I did not like his actions, and so I didn’t go there, anymore.49

From her diary, we find that Elizabeth had an active social life, dining out three times a week while also spending time with her children. She ended up outliving three of her children. She died in 1822, in the village of Newland, Gloucestershire.

== Popular culture ==
The Sharma Sisters in the TV show, Bridgerton, were said to have been partially inspired by real-life individuals like Elizabeth Sharaf Un Nisa.

== See also ==
- Dean Mahomed
- British Indians
