= Vidya Vihar Institute of Technology =

- Aryabhatta Knowledge University
- Location: Purnea, Bihar, India
- Coordinates: 25.742476°N 87.461214°E
- Full name: Vidya Vihar Institute of Technology, Maranga, Purnea
- Motto in English: Atma Deepo Bhav
- Founders: Mr. Ramesh Chandra Mishra, Er. Rajesh Chandra Mishra, Er. Brajesh Chandra Mishra
- Established: 2009
- Status: Running
- Colors: Red, White
- Director: Prof. (Dr.) Asheshwar Yadav
- Warden: Dr. A K Pankaj
- Principal: Prof. (Dr.) Manish Kumar
- Dean: Prof. (Dr.) B.K Mandal
- Undergraduates: B.Tech, BBA, BCA, BMC
- Newspaper: Technosphere
- Major events: OORJA
- Website: www.vvit.org

Vidya Vihar Institute of Technology is an engineering college established in 2009 by Vidya Vihar educational trust at Purnea, Bihar, India. It is affiliated to Aryabhatta Knowledge University, Patna and has approval of AICTE, New Delhi.

== History ==
The college was established in the year 2009 and was recognized by Science and Technology Department, Government of Bihar. It was inaugurated in 2009 as a follow-up endeavour of the Residential School of Bihar - Vidya Vihar Residential School. The students have consistently topped the Aryabhatta Knowledge University since inception. In 2011-15 batch 1st semester, Nidhi Kumari was state topper in overall branch, in Aryabhatta Knowledge University. In 2011-15 batch, 7th semester exams, Sumit Kumar Singh (ME) was state topper in overall branch with 9.64 SGPA. The College was a venue of National Conference on Information Science and Technology in March 2014.
