= National Highway 131A (India) =

National highway in India

National Highway 131A
- Map of National Highway 131A in red

Route information
- Auxiliary route of NH 31
- Length: 97 km (60 mi)

Major junctions
- North end: Malda Town
- South end: Purnea

Location
- Country: India
- States: Bihar, West Bengal

Highway system
- Roads in India; Expressways; National; State; Asian
← NH 12	→ NH 27

National Highway 131A, commonly called NH 131A is a national highway in India. It is a branch of National Highway 31. NH-131A traverses the states of Bihar and West Bengal in India. It will connect Malda in West Bengal to Purnia in Bihar via Katihar. A bridge will also be constructed per the plan.

== Route ==
Malda, Ratua, Debipur, nakatti, Durgapur, Ahmedabad, Manihari, Katihar, Purnia.

== Junctions ==
NH 12 Terminal near Malda.
NH 31 at Katihar.
NH 27 Terminal at Purnia.

== See also ==
- List of national highways in India
- List of national highways in India by state
