= Line Bazar Purnia =

Line Bazar
- Neighborhood
- Interactive map of Line Bazar
- Location in Bihar, India Location in India
- Coordinates: 25.78415°N 87.48998°E
- Country: India

Government
  - District Magistrate: Anshul Kumar IAS(IAS)
  - Mayor: Vibha Kumari

Languages
  - Spoken: Hindi, English, Maithili, Urdu and Angika

Line Bazar is a neighborhood in the city of Purnia, Bihar. It is a medical hub serving a large population of patients from North-East Bihar as well as neighboring Nepal and West Bengal. Sadar Hospital and Purnia Government Medical College are located here. Line Bazar is located on NH 231.

== Prominent Hospitals ==
- Government Medical College and Hospital, Purnea
- Hope Hospital
- Sanjeeveni Hospital
- Maa Pancha Devi Stone Hospital
- Fatma Hospital
- Harsh Hospital
- Sadbhavna General Hospital

== Police Stations ==
- Sahayak Khazanchi Hat Police Station
- Phanishwar Nath Renu TOP
