= Purnia =

Purnia Pūrniyan
- Urban Agglomeration
- Purnea
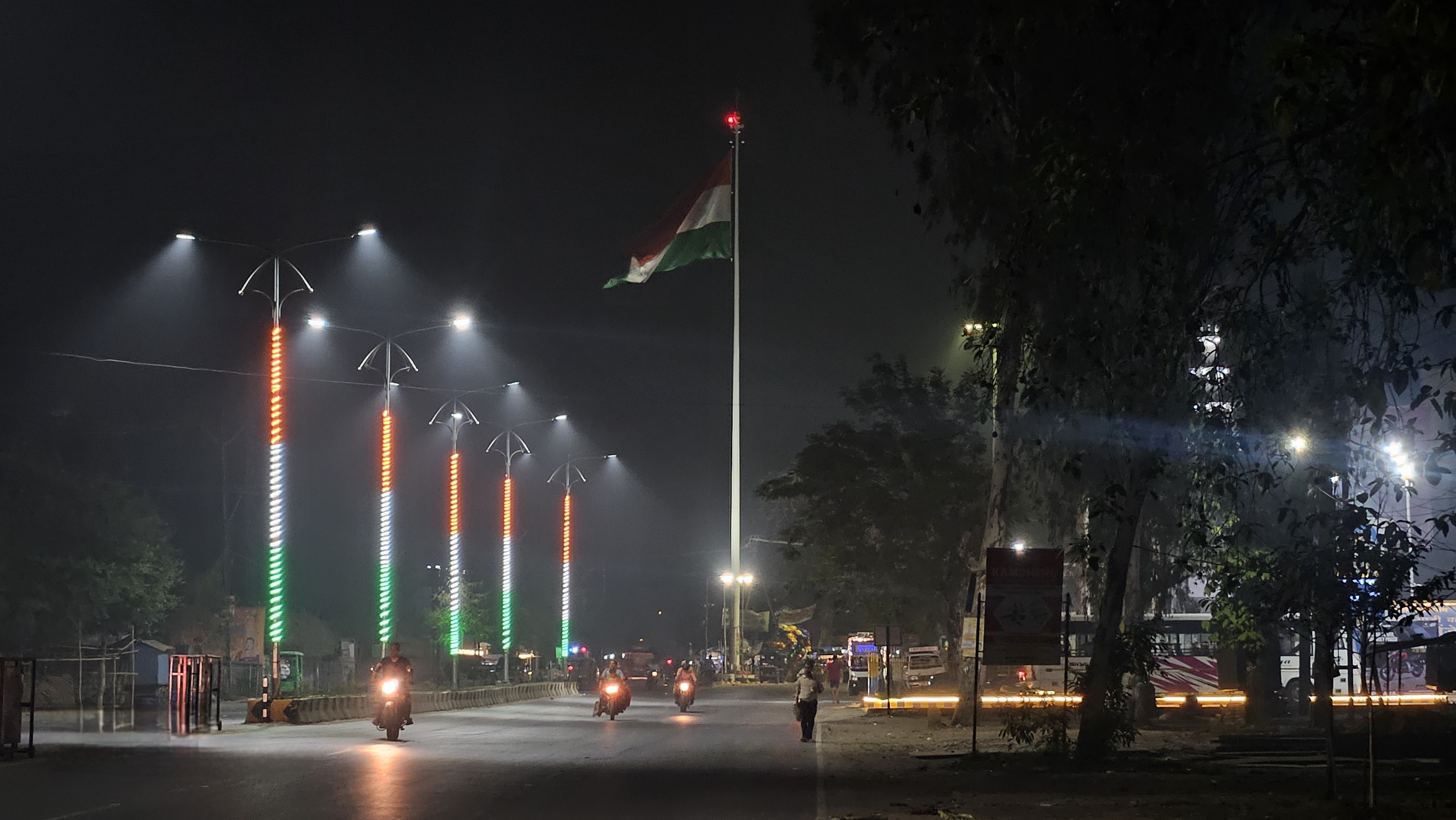
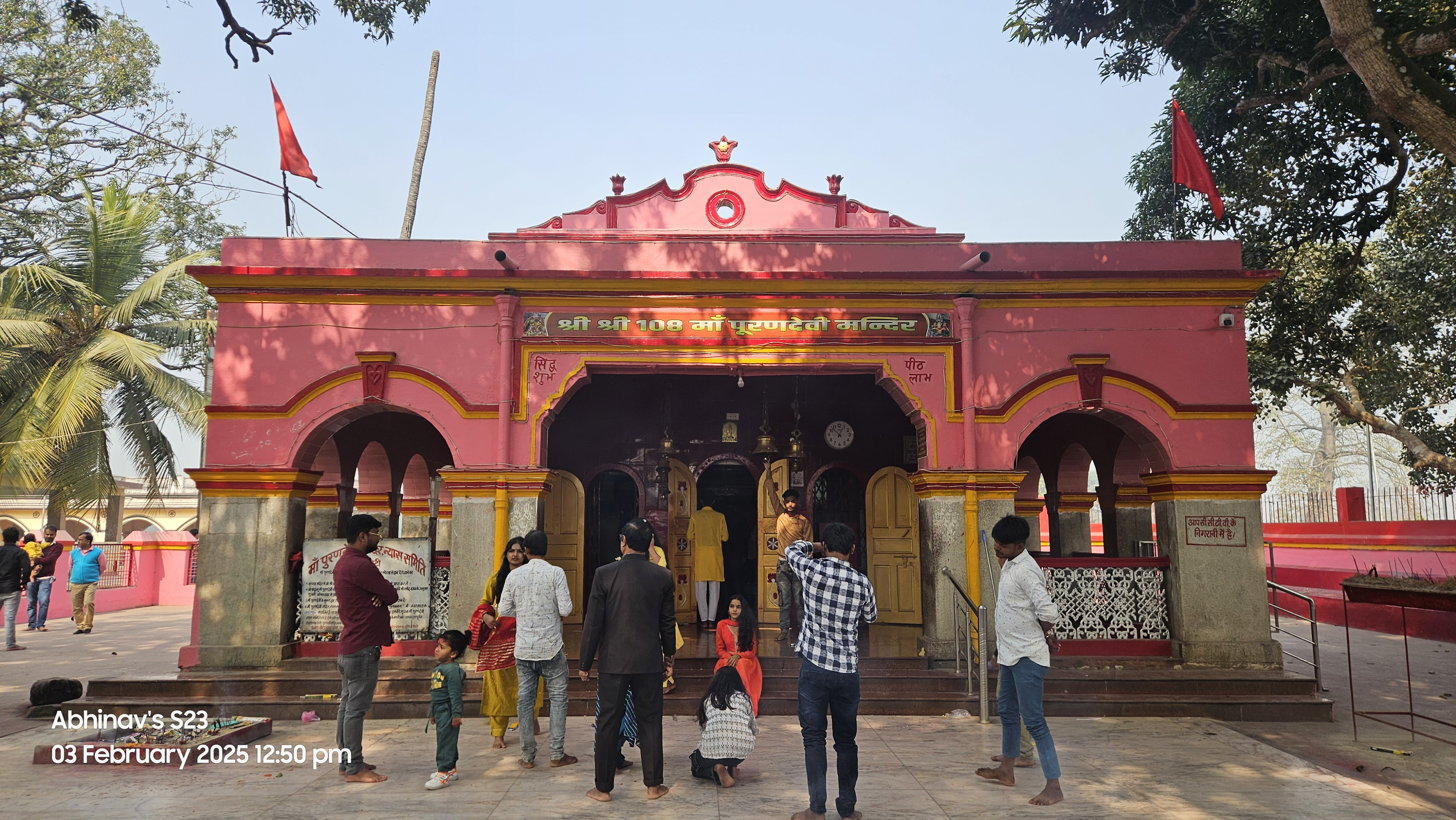
- Tricolour hosted at Jail Chowk Purnia Maa Puran Devi Mandir, Purnea City
- Nicknames: Mini Darjeeling, Makhana Capital of India
- Location in Bihar, India Location in India
- Coordinates: 25.778°N 87.476°E
- Country: India
- State: Bihar
- Region: Mithila
- Subregion: Kosi-Seemanchal
- Division: Purnia
- District: Purnia
- Established: 14 February 1770
- Named for: Goddess Puran Devi or Sanskrit word Purn Aranya

Government
  - Type: Municipal Corporation (India)
  - Body: Purnia Municipal Corporation
  - Mayor: Bibha Kumari
  - MP: Pappu Yadav
  - MLA: Vijay khemka

Area
  - Urban Agglomeration: 92 km^{2} (36 sq mi)
  - Urban: 60 km^{2} (23 sq mi)
  - Rank: 2nd in Bihar
- Elevation: 36 m (118 ft)

Population
  - Urban Agglomeration: 496,830
  - Rank: 4th in Bihar
  - Urban: 496,830

Language
  - Official: Hindi
  - Additional official: Urdu
  - Regional: Maithili, Bengali, Surjapuri, Purbi Maithili and Angika
- Time zone: UTC+5:30 (IST)
- PIN: 854301, 854302 (Main City), 854303 (South-West Suburbs & Purnia Airport), 854304 (North-West Suburbs), 854305 (Khuskibagh & Purnia Railway station), 854326 (Eastern Suburbs), 854330 (Northern Suburbs & Kasba) (Purnia)
- Telephone code: +91 6454
- Vehicle registration: BR-11
- Literacy: 74.09%
- Lok Sabha constituency: Purnia
- Website: purnea.bih.nic.in

Purnia (also romanized and officially known as Purnea) is the fourth largest city of Bihar and is emerging as the largest economic hub in North Bihar. It serves as the administrative headquarters of both Purnia district and Purnia division in the Indian state of Bihar. It is well known for its favourable climate like Darjeeling and has an abundance of resources for human settlements and economic activities.

The total geographical area of Purnia Urban Agglomeration is 92 km^{2} (35.52 sq mi) which is next only to Patna. The population density of the city is 3058 persons per km sq. making it the 4th largest city of Bihar by population. It is nearly 315 km from Patna, as well as 171 km from Siliguri, 90 km from Bhagalpur. It is 640 km from Guwahati (approximately) and 450 km from Kolkata, the capital of the adjacent state of West Bengal and the largest city in East India. Purnia district covers 3202.31 sq. km of the state of Bihar. The Indian Army, Indian Air Force, and three of five branches of India's Central Armed Police Forces – the Border Security Force (BSF), the Sashastra Seema Bal (SSB), and the Indo-Tibetan Border Police (ITBP) – have bases around the district.

== Etymology ==
Several possible origins for the name Purnia have been proposed. The name may originate from the Sanskrit word Purna–Aranya, which means "complete jungle". Purnia could also be an altered form of the old name Purania, derived from the word purain or Lotus, which is said to have grown on the Kosi and Mahananda rivers.

The city's name is also romanized as Purnea.

== History ==
=== Ancient History ===
Purnia is part of the Mithila region. Mithila first gained prominence after being settled by Indo-Aryan peoples who established the Mithila Kingdom (also called Kingdom of the Videhas). During the late Vedic period (c. 1100–500 BCE), Videha became one of the major political and cultural centers of South Asia, along with Kuru and Pañcāla. The kings of the Videha Kingdom were called Janakas. The Videha Kingdom was later incorporated into the Vajjika League, which had its capital in the city of Vaishali, which is also in Mithila.

The earliest inhabitants of Purnia were Angas and Pundras. In the epics, the Angas are grouped with the Bengal tribes and were the eastern most tribes known to the Aryans during the period of Atharva Samhita while the Pundras, although they had Aryan blood were regarded as degraded class of people in the Aitareya Brahmana, Mahabharata and Manu Samhita, because they neglected the performance of sacred rites.

=== Medieval history ===
During the ninth century, the Pala dynasty rose to power in the region formerly known as Pundra and Anga. A monolithic structure located near the Darara factory in the western part of the district is believed to date from this period.

By the beginning of the thirteenth century, the southern portion of the district is said to have formed part of the kingdom of Lakshman Sen, whose capital was at Nadia. This region was subsequently conquered by Bakhtiyar Khilji during the early phase of Muslim expansion in eastern India.

In the early days of Mughal rule, Purnia functioned as a remote military frontier province of the Mughal Empire. A substantial portion of its revenue was expended on defending its borders against frequent incursions by tribal groups from the north and east. In the early seventeenth century, a faujdar was appointed with the title of Nawab, combining military command of the frontier forces with the fiscal responsibilities of a diwan, or superintendent of revenues. At this time, the northern frontier was marked by Jalalgarh, a fortified outpost located a few miles north of Purnia town.

In 1722, the office of faujdar was held by Saif Khan, regarded as the most prominent governor of Purnea. He significantly expanded the district’s boundaries, pushing the Nepalis frontier approximately 30 miles northward to its present position. He also annexed the Dharampur pargana, which at the time lay west of the Kosi River and was formerly part of the sarkar of Monghyr.

One of Saif Khan’s successors, Shaukat Jang, later declared war against Siraj-ud-Daulah, the Nawab of Bengal. In 1757, Siraj-ud-Daulah—emboldened by his recent capture of Calcutta—marched toward Purnea and secured a decisive victory at Nawabganj.

The district came under British control in 1765, along with the rest of Bengal. However, it remained in a state of administrative disorder until 1770, when a British official was appointed with the title of Superintendent, marking the beginning of effective colonial administration.

During the Indian Rebellion of 1857, two groups of mutineers entered Purnia. Owing to the prompt and decisive action of the Commissioner, George Yule, they were driven into Nepal before they could cause any serious disturbance.

=== European Settlement in Purnia during Early British Rule ===
In the early phase of British rule, several Europeans arrived in Purnia and settled there permanently. At that time, Purnia was truly Purainiya—a region dominated by dense forests. In the initial years, European settlers established themselves around the Saura River, located in the central part of the town, an area that is today known as Rambagh.

Over time, Europeans gradually moved westward from the Saura River and began constructing large residential estates, known as kothis. Similar to the Civil Lines found in cities such as Lucknow and Kanpur, Purnia also developed a comparable area. However, while Civil Lines in other cities were primarily inhabited by British administrative officers, Purnia’s Civil Lines were largely home to European “gentleman farmers.”

Among the most influential European zamindars in Purnia were Alexander John Forbes and Palmer.

In 1859, Alexander John Forbes purchased the Sultanpur Pargana from Murshidabad-based moneylender Babu Pratap Singh, thereby becoming a zamindar. The town of Forbesganj (formerly spelled Farbisganj) was established in Sultanpur Pargana and named after him. Despite owning Sultanpur, Forbes resided in Purnia town, where he was quite popular. He showed a keen interest in social and recreational activities and played a role in establishing racecourses and clubs. The site where the Girls’ High School stands today once housed Forbes’ residence. In its time, this kothi was a hub of European social life.

Another European who lived in Purnia for an extended period was Palmer. He purchased a local royal estate and settled in the region. Today, the grand residence of the Hays family serves as the main building of Purnia College.

Opposite Forbes’ residence once stood the house of a prominent indigo planter. It is believed that the racecourse in Purnia was developed by this planter, William Terry. Terry is remembered controversially and is often described as oppressive in local memory.

Indigo cultivation in Purnia was first introduced by an Englishman named John Kelly. Subsequently, several Europeans expanded indigo farming in the region. The Shillingford family was among the most prominent, establishing indigo factories (neel kothis) in areas such as Neelganj, Mahendrapur, and Bhavbada.

These European gentleman farmers played a significant role in transforming Purainiya into modern Purnia. They contributed extensively to urban planning and settlement. The town was characterized by open spaces, abundant greenery, and the influence of the Saura and Kosi rivers, along with their numerous tributaries flowing around the city. European settlers constructed elegant residences both within the town and in surrounding areas. In 1882, Loreto Convent of Darjeeling established a residential school in Purnia specifically for the children of these European gentleman farmers.

== Tourism ==
Purnea is home to several significant religious sites attracting devotees from across the region.

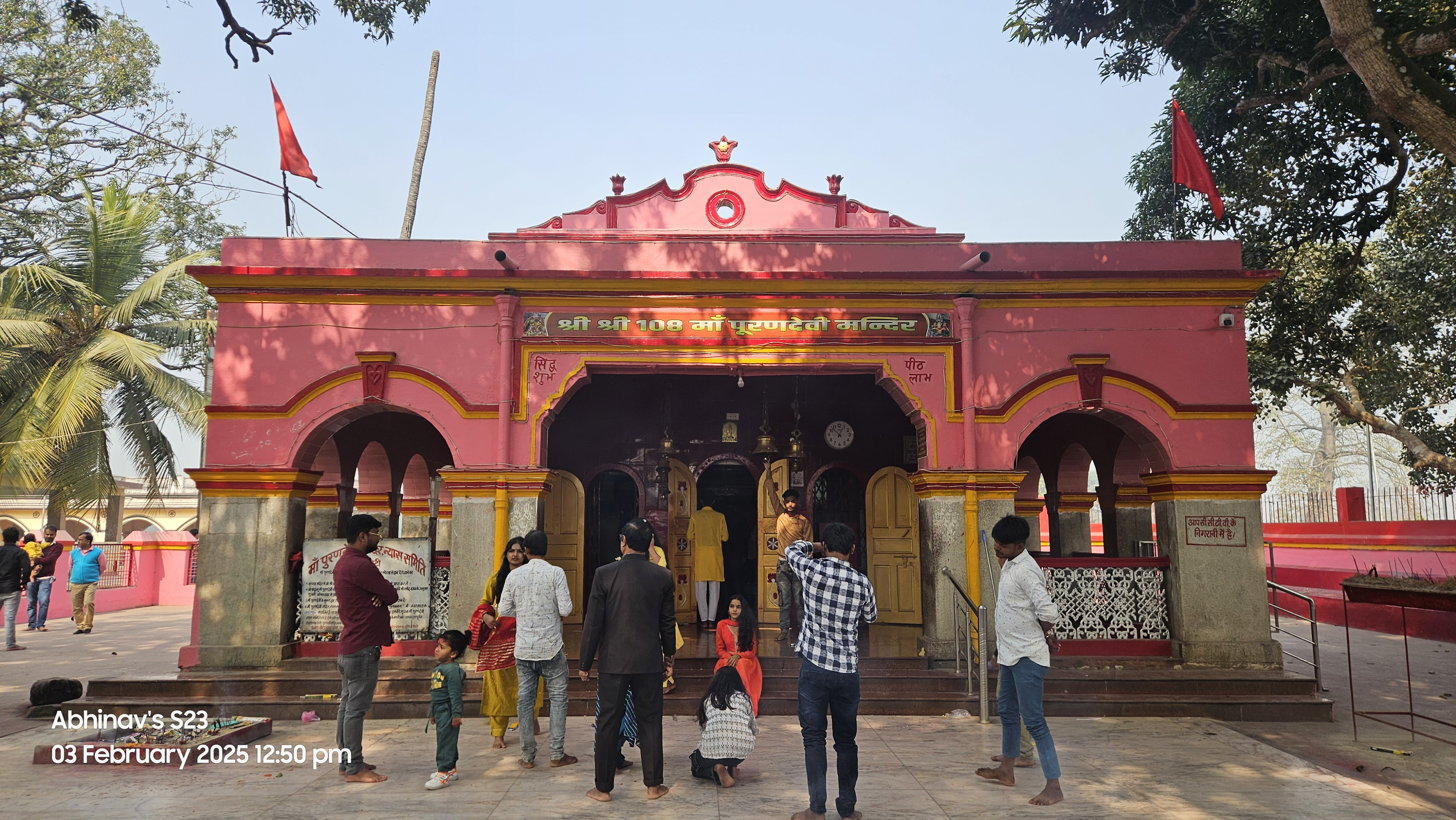
Maa Puran Devi Mandir, Purnea City

- Purandevi Mandir – Dedicated to Maa Puran Devi, believed to be one of the Sidh Peethas, drawing large crowds during Durga Puja, situated at Purnea City.

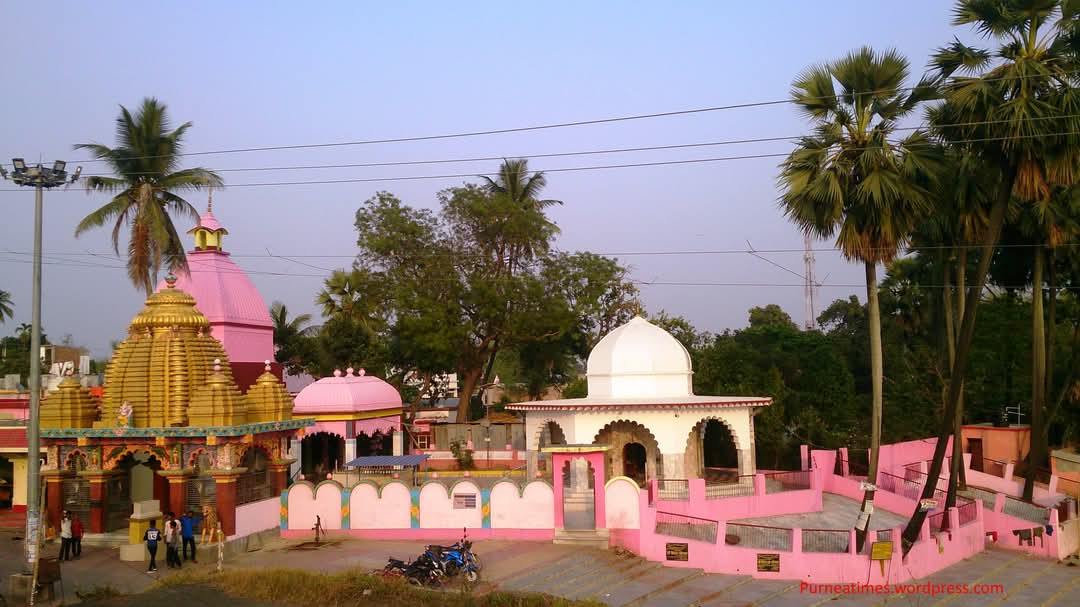
City Kali Mandir, Purnea City

- City Kali Bari – A revered Kali temple, situated on the bank of Saura river. Established by the Bengali community, this temple follows traditional Bengali customs and rituals.

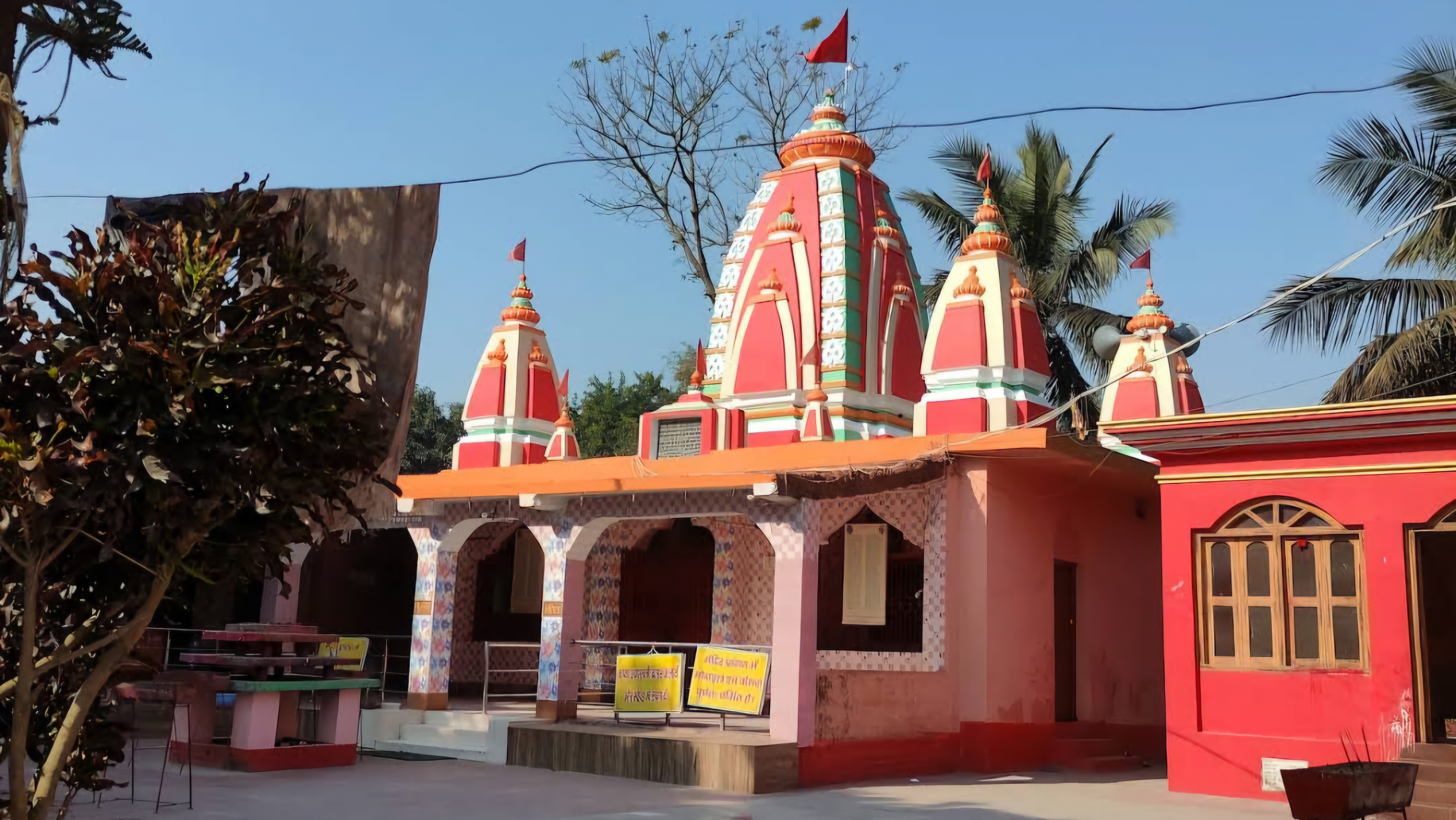
Mata Sthan, Adampur Purnea

- Mata Sthan – A well-known pilgrimage site dedicated to Goddess Shakti, situated at Adampur.

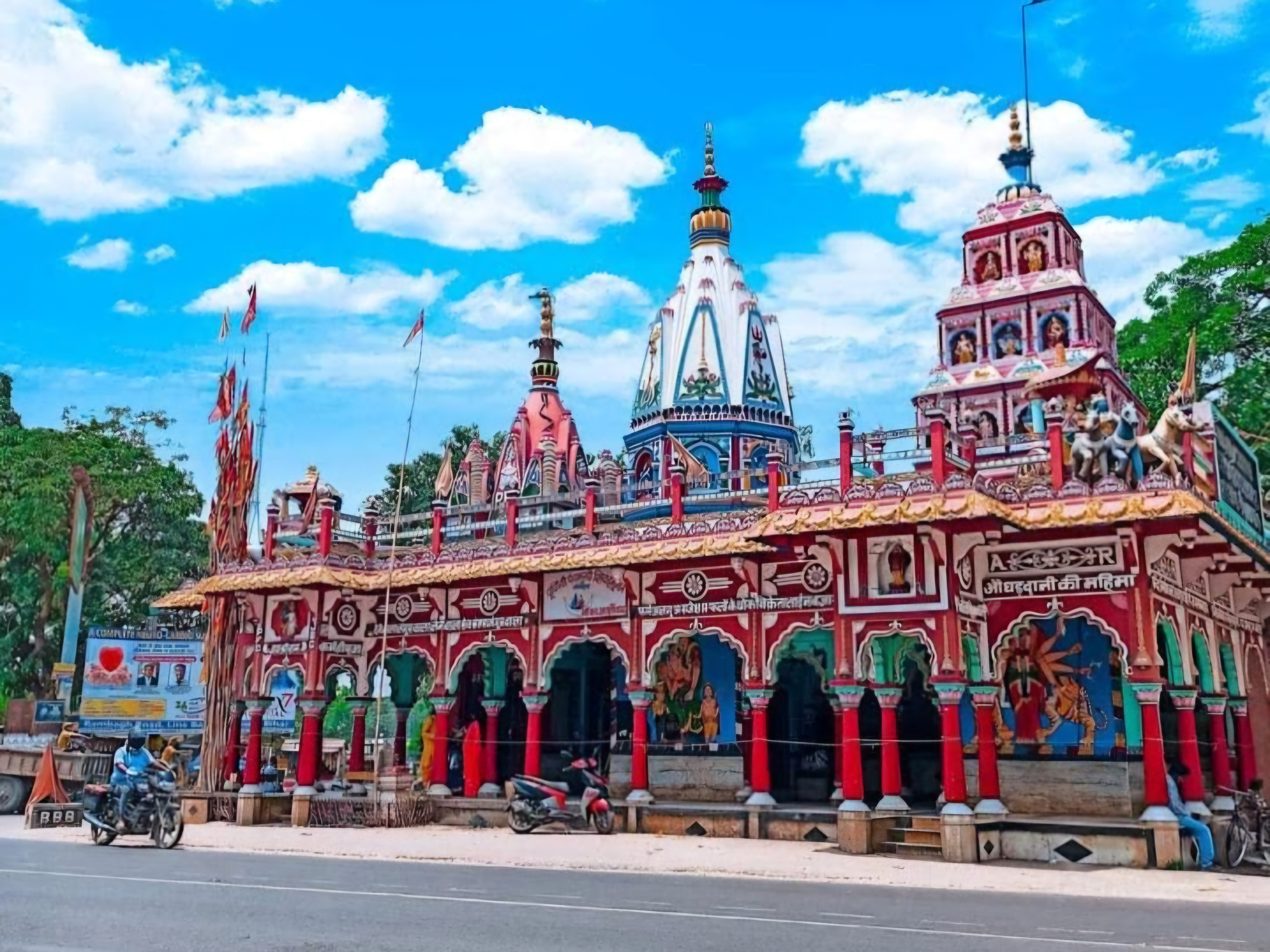
Panchmukhi Mandir, Forbesganj More, Purnea

- Panchmukhi Mandir – A temple devoted to Lord Hanuman, known for its five-faced idol at Forbesganj More NH 231.

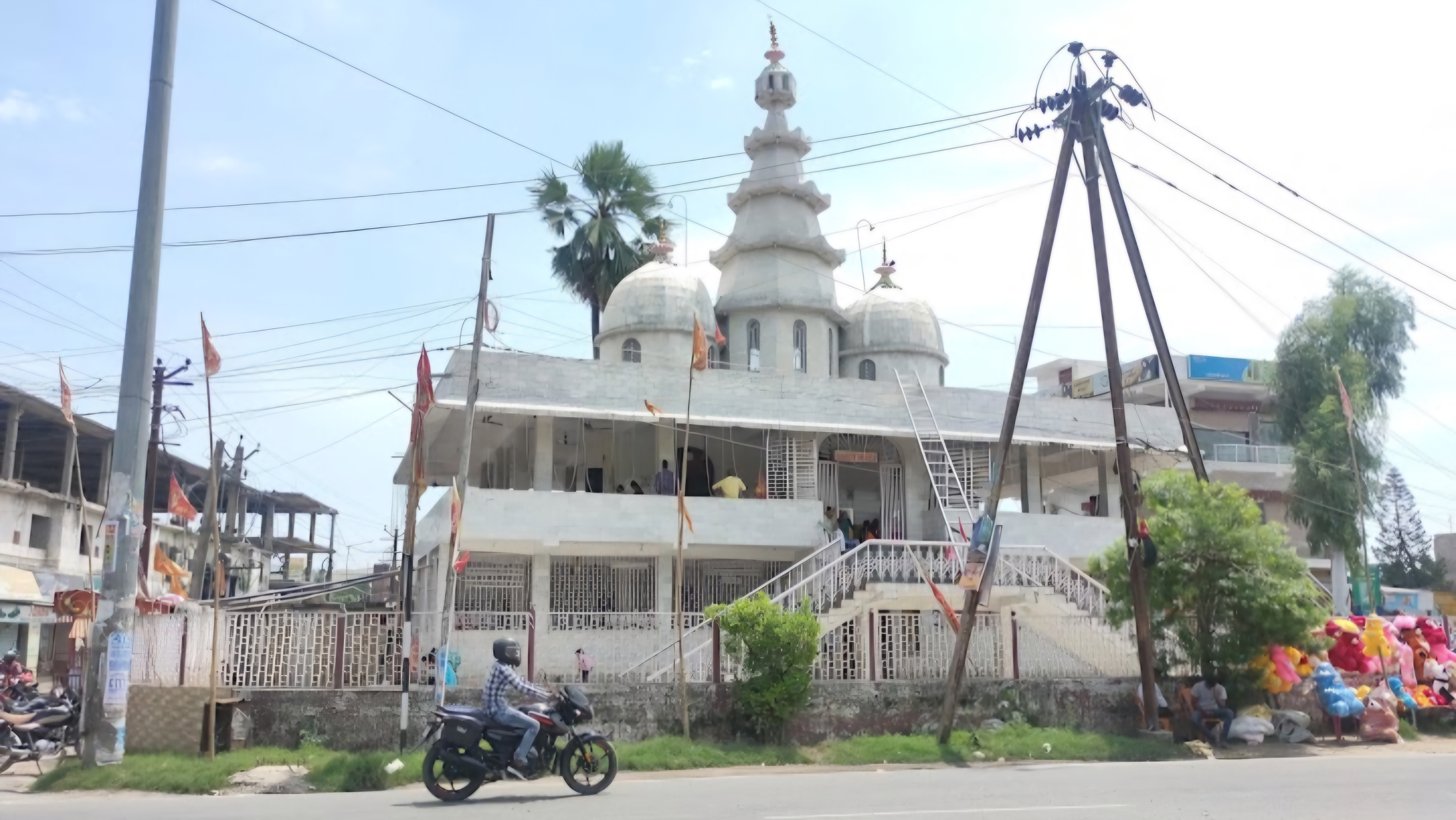
Aastha Mandir, Jail Chowk, Purnea

- Aastha Mandir – A modern temple serving as a center for religious and community gatherings, devoted to Krishna.

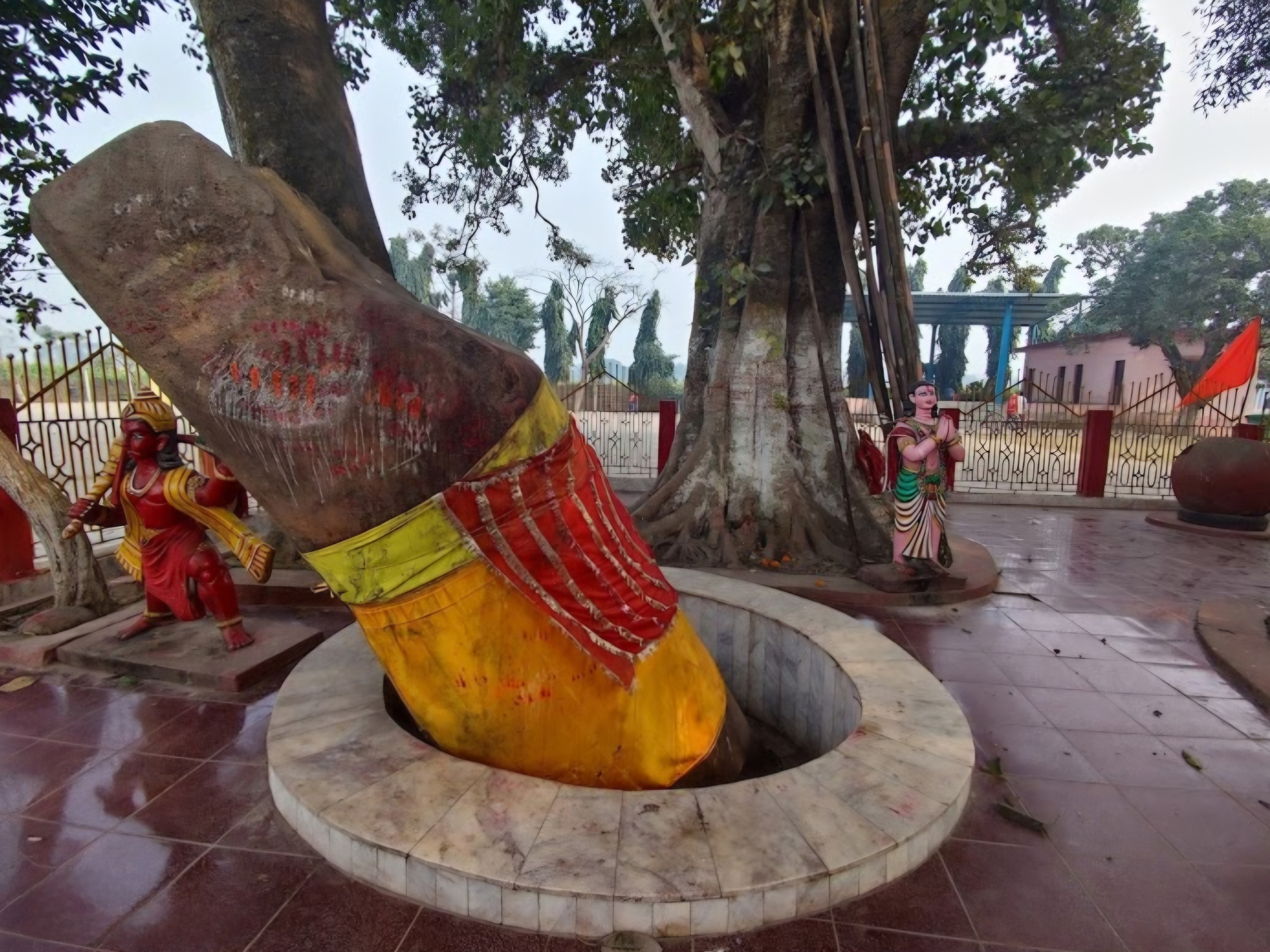
Prahalad Sthambh, Banmankhi, Purnea

- Prahalad Sthambh – Associated with the Narasimha-Prahlad legend, symbolizing devotion and righteousness. It is situated at Banmankhi.

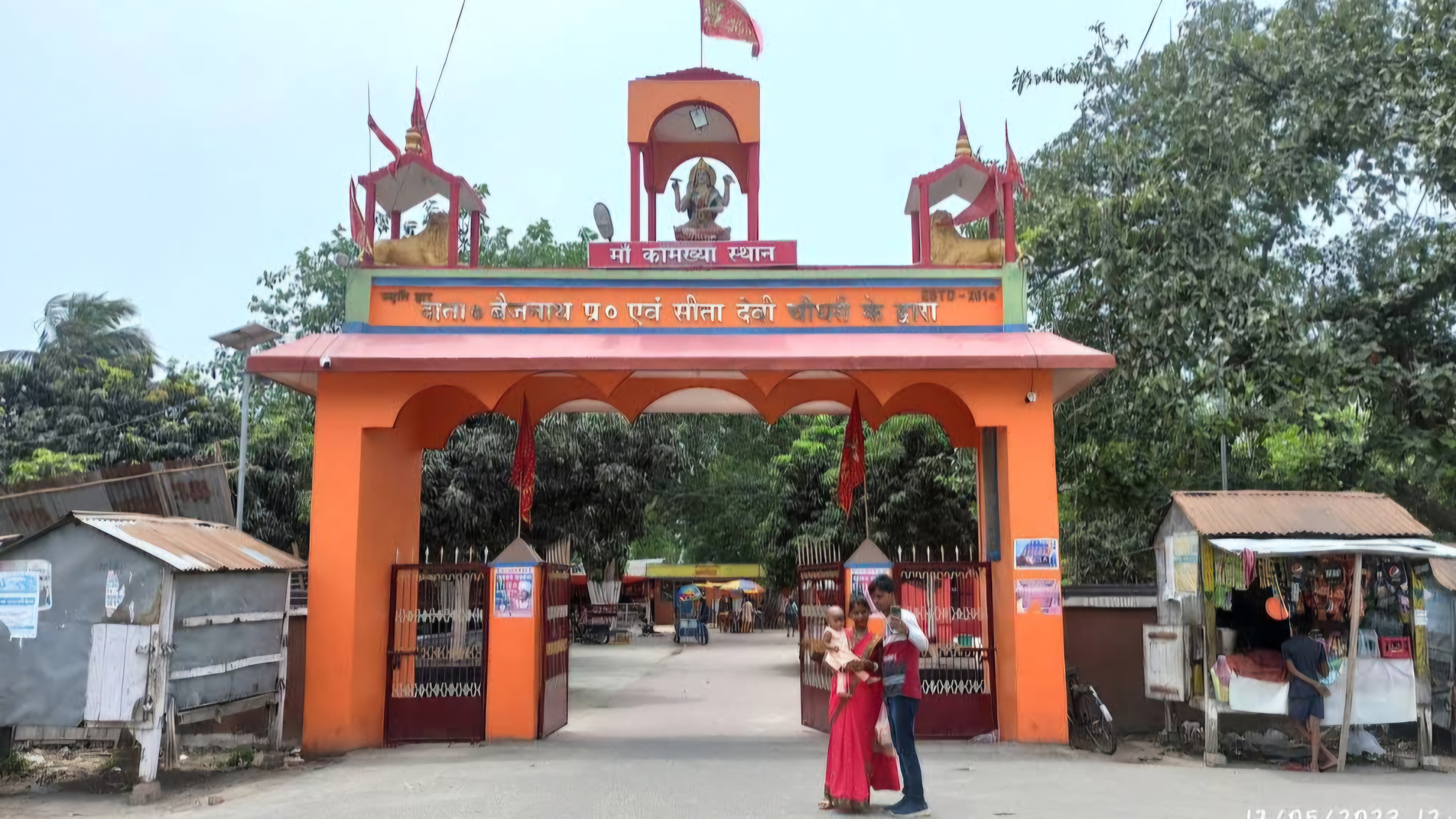
Kamakhya Mandir, Majra, Purnea

- Kamakhya Mandir – Inspired by Assam’s Kamakhya Temple, known for Tantric rituals, situated at Majra.

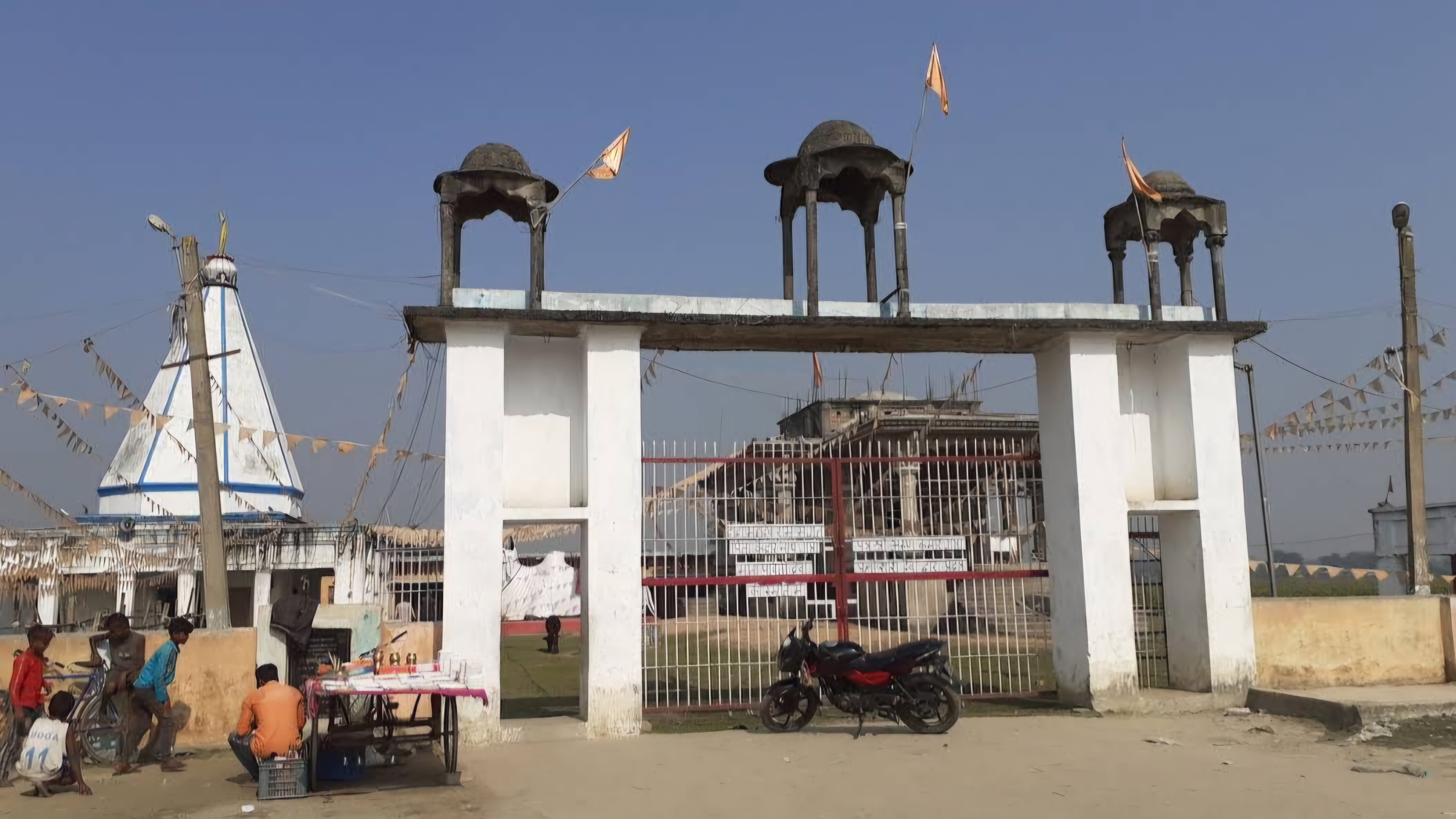
Dhima Shiv Temple, Banmankhi, Purnea

- Dhima Shiv Temple – A sacred Shiva temple, particularly significant during Mahashivaratri, is situated in Banmankhi.

== Geography ==
Purnia and its surrounding lands lie in the sub-montane alluvial tract of the Gangetic Plain. The city however lies on the banks of numerous tributaries of the Koshi River. Two major rivers traverse Purnia city with the Kari Kosi river on the western end and the Saura river on the eastern end. The main city is situated between these two rivers.

Purnia city has an area of 92 square kilometres (36 sq mi).

== Climate ==
Purnia is known for its favourable climate; it has earned the name "Mini Darjeeling" for this reason. Purnia has a largely humid climate, with the highest level of rainfall in Bihar state and humidity rising to above 70%. A cold season, from November to February, is followed by a hot season from March to June. The monsoon season begins in early June and lasts until September; 82% of its total annual rainfall falls during the monsoon season.

January, the coldest month, has a mean daily minimum temperature of 5 to 10 °C and a mean daily maximum of 20 to 25 °C. Wind is typically light in the non-monsoon seasons but during the monsoon, storms and depressions originating in the Bay of Bengal cause heavy rain and strong winds.

Climate data for Purnia (1991–2020, extremes 1901–present)
Month	Jan	Feb	Mar	Apr	May	Jun	Jul	Aug	Sep	Oct	Nov	Dec	Year
Record high °C (°F)	29.3 (84.7)	35.3 (95.5)	40.6 (105.1)	43.3 (109.9)	43.9 (111.0)	43.5 (110.3)	38.9 (102.0)	38.2 (100.8)	37.4 (99.3)	36.6 (97.9)	34.8 (94.6)	31.6 (88.9)	43.9 (111.0)
Mean daily maximum °C (°F)	22.5 (72.5)	27.2 (81.0)	32.2 (90.0)	35.1 (95.2)	34.8 (94.6)	34.4 (93.9)	33.3 (91.9)	33.5 (92.3)	33.3 (91.9)	32.5 (90.5)	29.9 (85.8)	25.3 (77.5)	31.2 (88.2)
Mean daily minimum °C (°F)	9.0 (48.2)	11.6 (52.9)	16.1 (61.0)	20.4 (68.7)	23.4 (74.1)	25.1 (77.2)	25.7 (78.3)	25.8 (78.4)	24.8 (76.6)	21.5 (70.7)	15.2 (59.4)	10.5 (50.9)	19.2 (66.6)
Record low °C (°F)	1.3 (34.3)	1.7 (35.1)	5.4 (41.7)	10.4 (50.7)	15.0 (59.0)	17.8 (64.0)	20.7 (69.3)	19.6 (67.3)	18.0 (64.4)	10.0 (50.0)	4.6 (40.3)	2.1 (35.8)	1.3 (34.3)
Average rainfall mm (inches)	8.2 (0.32)	8.2 (0.32)	14.9 (0.59)	45.5 (1.79)	140.6 (5.54)	284.6 (11.20)	350.6 (13.80)	301.7 (11.88)	310.6 (12.23)	81.3 (3.20)	5.0 (0.20)	4.0 (0.16)	1,555.2 (61.23)
Average rainy days	0.8	1.0	1.2	2.9	6.1	10.8	14.9	13.4	11.4	3.2	0.4	0.5	66.6
Average relative humidity (%) (at 17:30 IST)	79	65	50	53	64	75	81	82	84	80	80	83	73
Source: India Meteorological Department

== Demographics ==
As of the 2011 census, Purnia Municipal Corporation had a total population of 282,248, of which 148,077 were males and 134,171 were females. It had a sex ratio of 906 females to 1,000 males. The population below 6 years was 43,050. The literacy rate for the 6+ population was 73.02%, compared to the 74.04% national average. Purnia Urban Agglomeration, comprising Purnia Municipal Corporation and Kasba (Nagar Panchayat), had a population of 310,817 in 2011.

=== Religion and language ===
Languages spoken in Purnia City (2011)
1. Hindi (55.0%)
2. Urdu (14.9%)
3. Maithili (8.58%)
4. Bengali (8.19%)
5. Kurukh (2.31%)
6. Bhojpuri (1.60%)
7. Others (9.46%)

Religions in Purnia City (2011)
Religion	Percent
Hinduism	75.19 %
Islam	23.26%
Christianity	0.60%
Sikhism	0.12%
Jainism	0.35%
Others	0.52%

According to the 2011 census of India, 75.19% of Purnia's residents practice Hinduism. Islam is the second most popular at 23.26%. Christianity, Jainism, Sikhism, and Buddhism are among the other minority religions. 0.52% practice other religions and 0.1% no particular religion.

Maithili is the native language of Purnia, including its Angika and Purbi Maithili dialects. Hindi and Urdu, the official languages of the state of Bihar, are widely spoken. Bengali is also used by sections of the population. Bhojpuri, Surjapuri, Santali, and Kurukh are spoken by minority communities. English is commonly used as a secondary language and is taught in English-medium schools.

== Administration ==
Purnia serves as a major administrative hub in North-Eastern Bihar. It functions as the headquarters for several regional and district-level governing bodies:

- Purnia District: The city is the seat of the District Magistrate and Collector.
- Purnia Division: It acts as the divisional headquarters, overseeing the districts of Purnia, Araria, Katihar, and Kishanganj.
- Regional Offices: Hosts various Bihar Government regional offices, including those for education, health, and infrastructure development.

=== Civic Administration ===
The Purnia Urban Agglomeration is governed by two distinct municipal bodies responsible for providing essential utility services, infrastructure development, and sanitation.

Purnia Municipal Corporation

- The Purnia Municipal Corporation (PMC) is the primary civic body for the city.
- Area: Approximately 60 km^{2} (23.17 sq mi)
- Wards: The corporation is divided into 46 administrative wards.
- Responsibilities: Management of water supply, solid waste, street lighting, and urban planning within the core city limits.

Kasba Municipality

- The Kasba Municipality oversees the northern part of the urban sprawl.
- Area: Approximately 32 km^{2} (12.36 sq mi)
- Wards: Divided into 26 wards.
- Responsibilities: Providing civic amenities and regulatory oversight for the Kasba suburban area.

=== Law Enforcement ===
Law and order in the city and its outskirts are maintained by the Purnia Police. The urban area is served by several specialized and territorial police stations and Town Outposts (TOP).

Police Stations (Thana)
The primary police stations handling investigations and security include:

- Khazanchi Hat Police Station
- Sadar Police Station
- Madhubani Police Station
- Mufassil Police Station
- Maranga Police Station
- Sahayak Khazanchi Hat Police Station

Specialized Units

- Mahila Police Station
- Cyber Police Station
- SC and ST Police Station
- Traffic Police Station

Town Outposts (TOP)
Smaller units focused on localized patrolling and immediate response:

- Purnea City OP
- Bhatta Bazar TOP
- Gulabbagh TOP
- Katihar More TOP
- Fanishwar Nath Renu TOP (named after the renowned local author)
- Sudin Chowk TOP

== Economy ==
In recent years, Purnia has become a regional epicenter for the service and automobile sectors. Primarily, Gulabbagh, Khuskibagh, Line Bazar, Bhatta Bazar, Madhubani Bazar, City Industrial Estate and Maranga Outgrowth Centre are the prime locations for the economic activities.

=== Gulabbagh and Khuskibagh ===
Gulabbagh and Khuskibagh are situated at eastern outskirts of main city, and known for their famous agriculture markets (in local language mandi). Many merchants come from Nepal and West Bengal to purchase supplies of raw materials, especially Maize. GulabBagh in Purnia houses a major grain storehouse and is Asia's largest maize trading center. This location as well as central and eastern Bihar supply the grain requirements of Bengal, Nepal, and the states of Northeast India. Numerous highways in Purnia, including NH 27, NH 231, NH 131A provide excellent connectivity to all parts of India. Khuskibagh has fruit and vegetable markets that are close to Purnia Junction (station code: PRNA), which provides rail connectivity.

== Healthcare ==
Purnia has one government medical college hospital, several government Urban Primary Health Centres (UPHCs), and numerous private hospitals that provide healthcare services to the city and surrounding regions.

=== Government Hospital ===
- Government Medical College and Hospital, Purnea

=== Government UPHC ===
- UPHC, Gulabbagh
- UPHC, Mata Chowk
- UPHC, Madhubani
- UPHC, Purnea Court
- UPHC, Purnea City

== Education ==
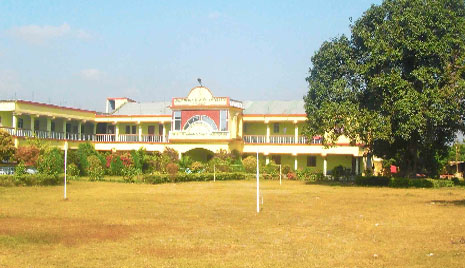
BMT Law College, Purnea

Purnia has historically been a center of education in the North Bihar region. The Zila School, founded in 1800 during the period of British rule, is the oldest school in Purnia and one of the largest in the city. Jawahar Navodaya Vidyalaya, Garhbanaili (located 14 km from the main city), is a prestigious government-run school. Vidya Vihar Residential School, a leading boarding school in Bihar, has its campus in Parora, Purnia. G D Goenka Public School, one of India's leading school chains, established its third campus in Bihar in Purnia, following those in Patna and Gaya. Purnia also has a Kendriya Vidyalaya.

=== Colleges ===
Purnea has several colleges offering higher education in disciplines such as engineering, law, arts, and home science. These institutions are recognized by the state government and affiliated with various universities, including Aryabhatta Knowledge University, Bihar Agricultural University, and Purnea University.

The major colleges in Purnia include:

- Purnea College
- Purnea Mahila College
- Purnea College of Engineering
- Government Medical College and Hospital, Purnea
- Bhola Paswan Shastri Agricultural College
- B.M.T. Law College
- Government Polytechnic of Purnea
- Vidya Vihar Institute of Technology
- Millia Group of Colleges (managed by Millia Education Trust)
- Millia Institute of Technology
- Millia Polytechnic, Rambagh
- Simanchal Institute of Medical Science, Kasba
- Shershah Institute of Medical Sciences
- Medical College and Hospital by Millia Educational Trust

Additionally, a 3D animation and multimedia institute is located in Madhubani Bazar.

=== Healthcare ===
The Indian Red Cross Society operates the second-largest blood bank in Bihar, with a capacity of 1,000 units, following the one in Patna. The Bihar government has recently inaugurated one of three megastock warehouses for medicines at Kasba, which serves 13 districts of North Bihar.

=== Sports and recreation ===
The Indira Gandhi Stadium houses a Sports Authority of India sports hostel for athletes. The DSA and Zila School grounds serve as the city's outdoor stadiums. In January 2025, the Bihar government announced the construction of a modern sports complex at Rangbhumi Maidan in Purnia at a cost of ₹42 crore. The project aims to provide advanced facilities for local athletes, enabling them to perform excellently at the state and national levels.

=== University ===
Purnia is home to Purnea University, the ninth university in Bihar. It is the only university in the Purnia Commissionerate and includes affiliated colleges from the districts of Purnia, Katihar, Araria, and Kishanganj.

== Transportation ==
=== Airways ===
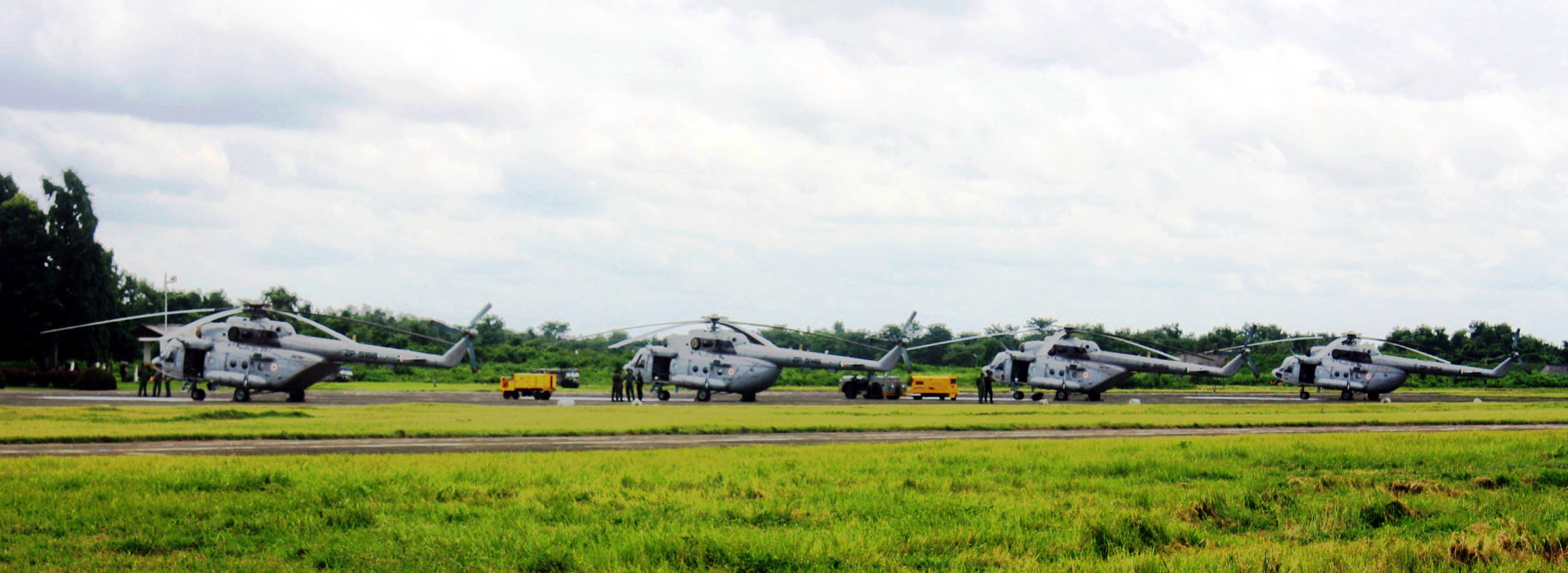
Helicopter at Air Force Station Purnea

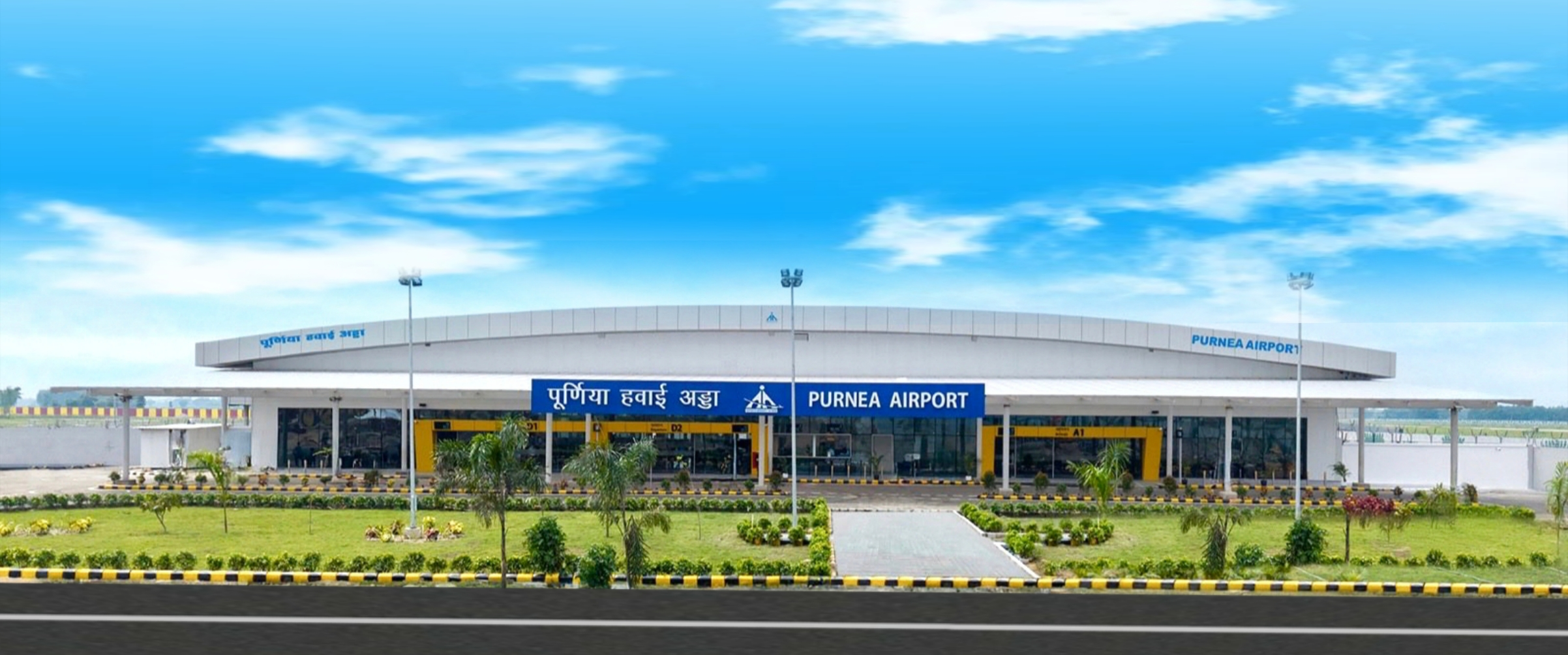
Terminal Building of Purnea Airport

- Purnia Airport (IATA: PXN, ICAO: VEPU), is located within the cantonment area and used by both army and commercial purpose, which is approximately 5 km from the city center. The airport operates scheduled flights for Delhi, Kolkata, Ahmedabad and Hyderabad.

=== Railways ===
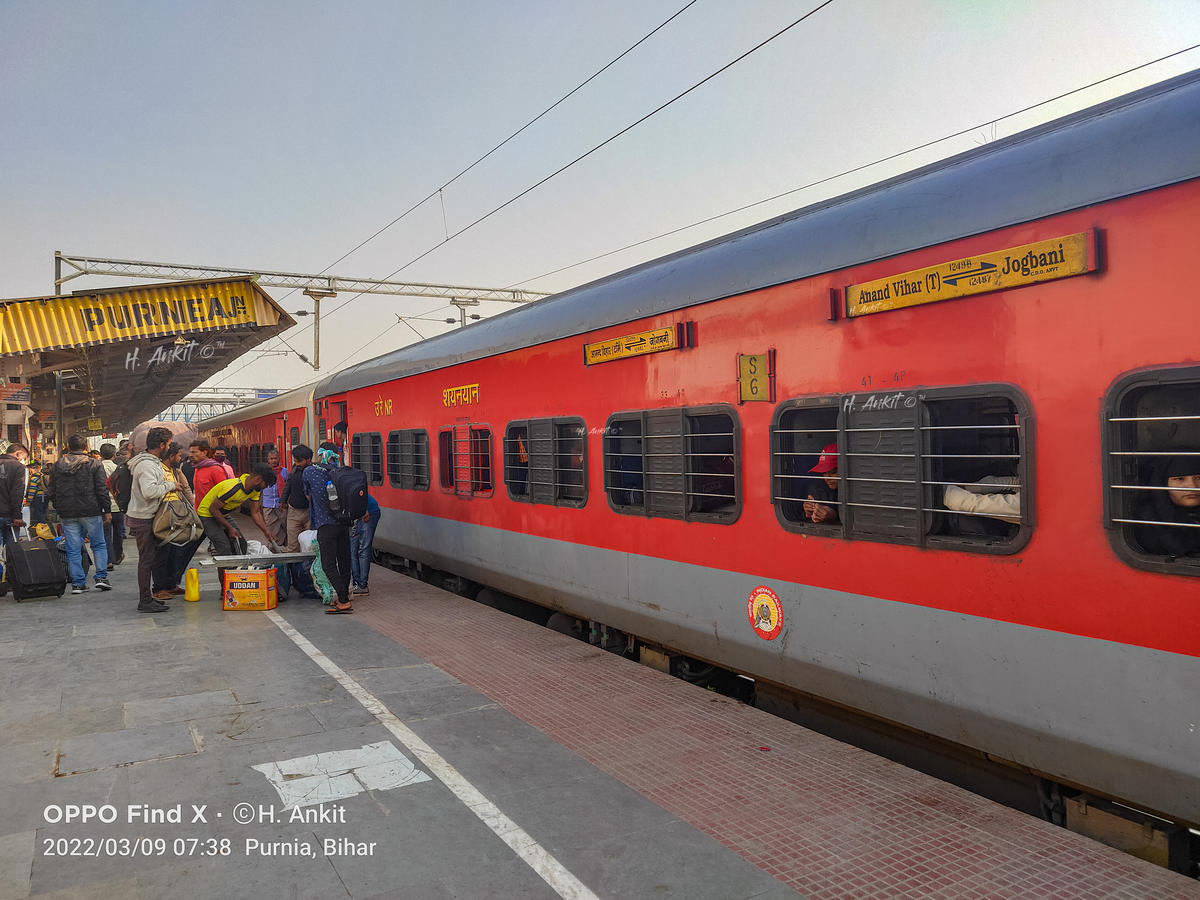
Purnia Junction

- Purnia Junction (station code: PRNA) is situated on Jogbani–Katihar line of the Northeast Frontier Railway (NFR), which is located 7 km from the city centre, and closer to the residents of Khuskibagh, Gulabbagh, and Eastern Purnia. This station have good connectivity to Jogbani, Katihar, Barauni, Danapur, Muzaffarpur Junction, Darbhanga, Samastipur, Siliguri Junction, Malda Town, Kolkata, Prayagraj Junction, Kanpur Central, Anand Vihar Terminal, Perambur and Erode. It is served by both Indian Railways premium trains; Vande Bharat Express & Amrit Bharat Express.

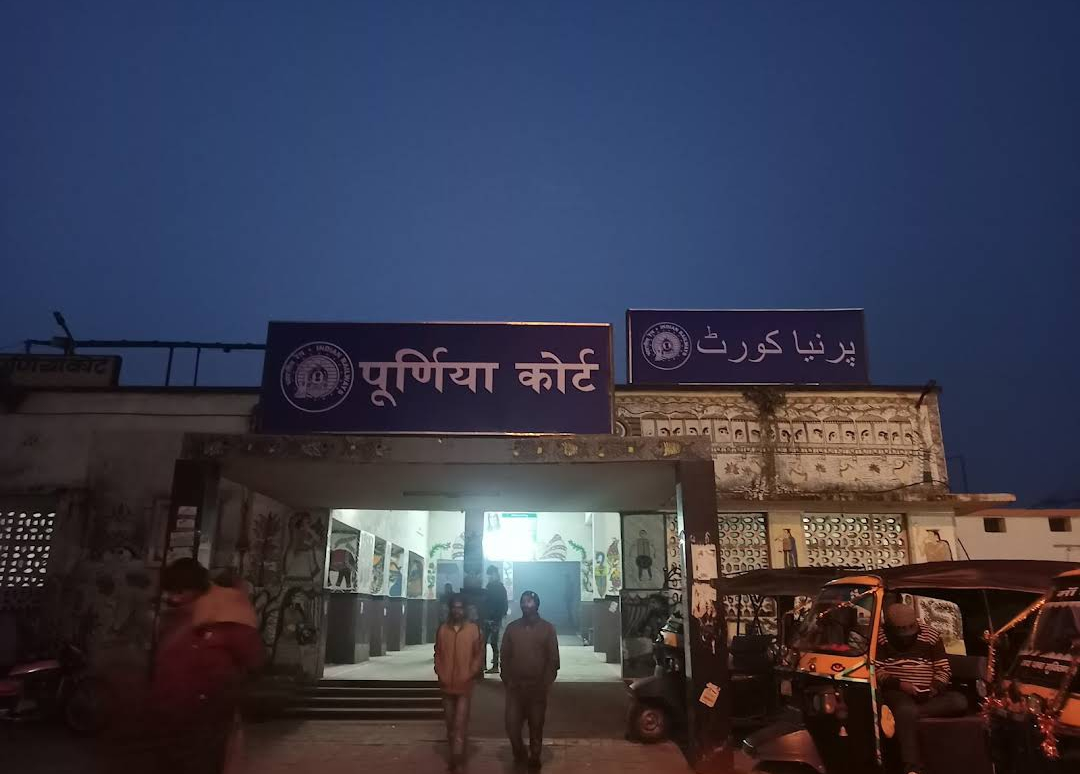
Purnia Court railway station

- Purnia Court (station code: PRNC) is located in main city area, serving Saharsa–Purnia line of the East Central Railway (ECR), and caters to the residents of Madhubani, Janta Chowk, Line Bazar, Central and Western Purnia. Many express trains originate from this station, that provides connectivity to Banmankhi Junction, Dauram Madhepura, Saharsa Junction, Khagaria Junction, Begusarai, Patna Junction, Gaya Junction, Bokaro, Ranchi, Chhapra Junction, Gorakhpur, Gonda Junction, Sitapur, Bareilly Junction, Moradabad, Ambala Cantonment, Ludhiana, Jalandhar City & Amritsar.

=== Roadways ===
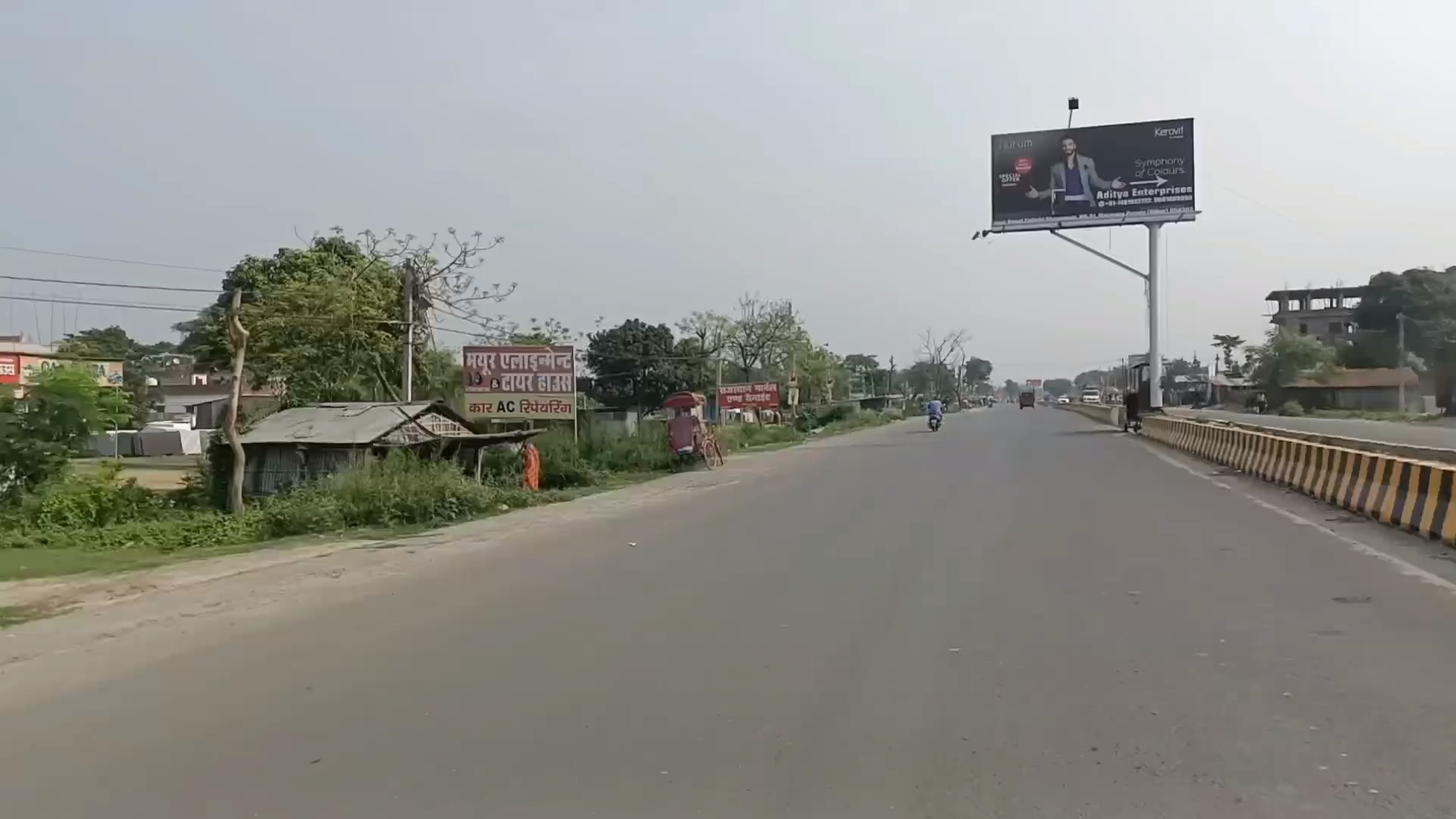
NH-231 at Purnea College of Engineering

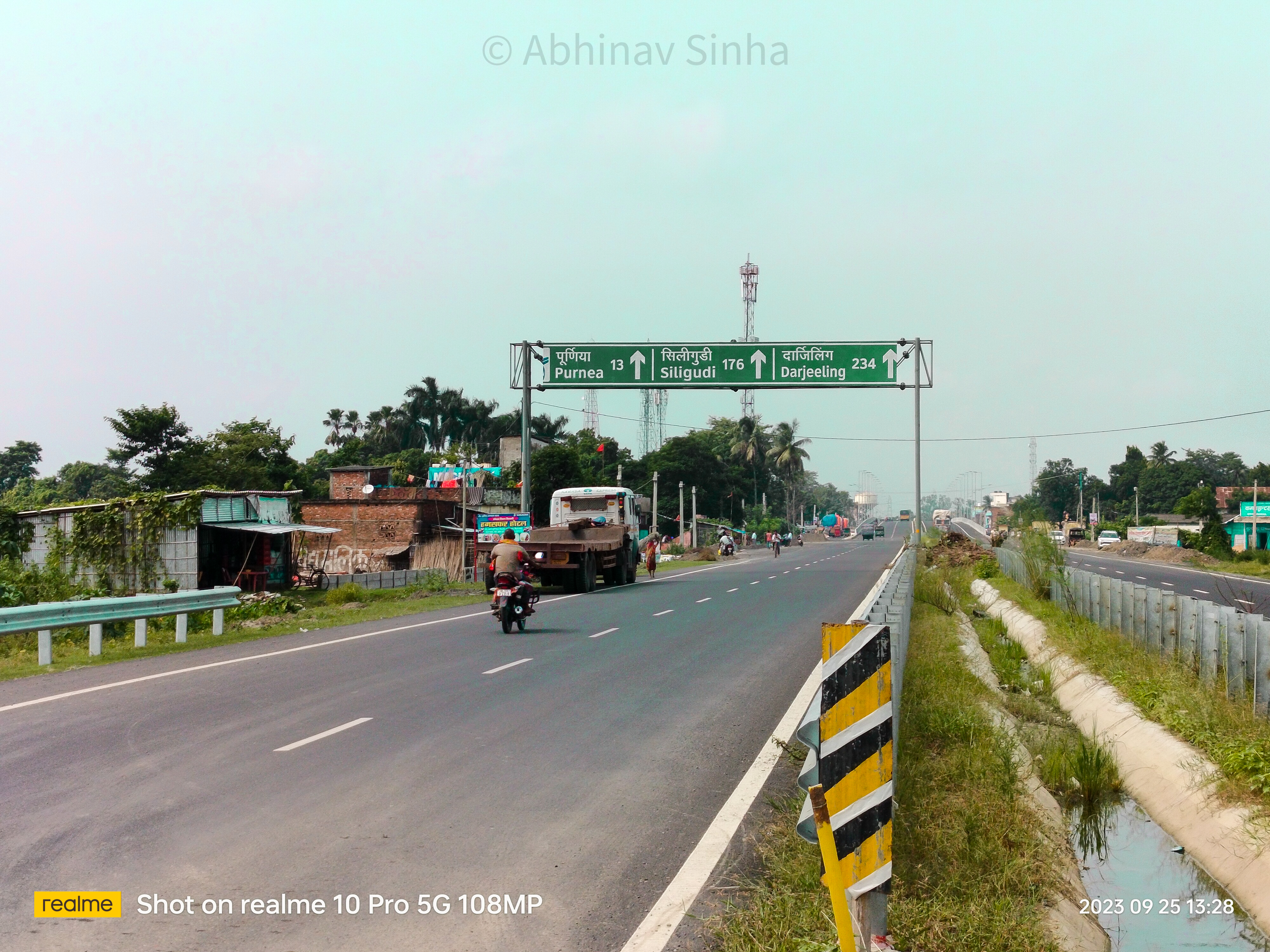
NH-131A Purnea-Manihari Highway

National Highways namely NH 31, NH 27, NH 231, NH 131A make Purnia accessible to the people from nearby cities & states while state highways connect the other neighbouring cities and villages to the main city area.

- NH 27, also known as the East–West Corridor, passes through Purnia. The corridor runs from Silchar to Porbandar, providing the city with excellent connectivity across India. It connects Purnia to major cities such as Silchar, Guwahati, Siliguri, Kolkata, Kishanganj, and Dalkhola in the east, and Lucknow, Gorakhpur, Muzaffarpur, Darbhanga, Supaul, Jogbani, Forbesganj, and Araria in the west.
- NH 231, which provides regional connectivity within Bihar, also passes through Purnia. It starts from Korha, at its junction with NH-31, connecting the city to Bhagalpur, Munger, Khagaria, Begusarai, Patna, and several other cities in Bihar. NH-231 further connects Purnia to Madhepura and Saharsa. The Khagaria–Purnia section, under NH-31 and NH-231, is currently being upgraded to a four-lane highway.
- NH 131A, originates in Purnia and is a four-lane national highway connecting the city to Katihar, Manihari, Sahibganj, and Malda. It serves as an important route linking Nepal with Jharkhand, facilitating interstate and cross-border connectivity.
- The Patna–Purnia Expressway is an under-construction greenfield national expressway connecting the state capital Patna to Purnia. Designated as, the expressway starts in Vaishali district and passes through Samastipur, Darbhanga, Saharsa, and Madhepura districts, before terminating in Purnia district. The expressway has a total length of approximately 244 km.

== Notable events ==
Phanishwar Nath Renu's popular story "Maare Gaye Gulfam" which was adapted into a film Teesri Kasam (The Third Vow), by Basu Bhattacharya (produced by the poet-lyricist Shailendra) in 1966 was shot in Purnia, in which old Purnea is pictured, especially 'the Gulabbag Mela'.

Purnia held the record for making and displaying the world's longest tricolour flag, with the length measured at 7,100 metres (7.1 km) before it was broken on 12 August 2019 by Raipur, Chattisgadh.

== Notable people ==
- Raja Bahadur Kirtyanand Sinha (1880–1938), patron and known for charitable works
- Syed Abdus Samad (footballer) (1895–1964), footballer
- Satinath Bhaduri (1906–1965), novelist and politician
- Phanishwar Nath Renu (1921–1977), novelist
- Balai Chand Mukhopadhyay (1899–1979), playwright and poet
- Bhola Paswan Shastri, three-time Chief Minister of Bihar
- Air Marshal A.K.Bharti, Deputy chief of the Air Staff, Indian Air Force
- Sushant Singh Rajput, actor
- Gurmeet Choudhary, actor
- Elizabeth Sharaf un-Nisa, 18th century Mughal noble

== See also ==
- Chunapur
