= Katihar =

City in Bihar, India

Katihar Katīhār
- Urban Agglomeration
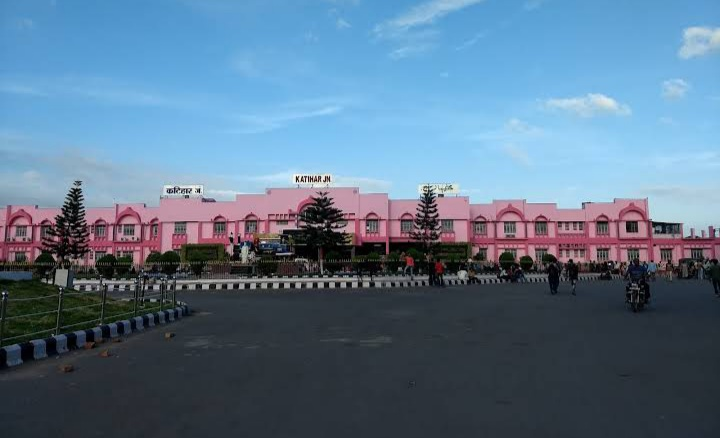
- Katihar Junction
- Nickname: Makhana Hub of India
- Location in Bihar Location in India
- Coordinates: 25.53°N 87.58°E
- Country: India
- State: Bihar
- Region: Mithila
- Subregion: Kosi-Seemanchal
- Division: Purnia
- District: Katihar

Government
  - Type: Municipal Corporation
  - Body: Katihar Municipal Corporation
  - MP: Tariq Anwar (INC)
  - MLA: Tarkishore Prasad (BJP)
  - Mayor: Usha Devi Agarwal

Area
  - Total: 50.46 km^{2} (19.48 sq mi)
- Elevation: 35.25 m (115.6 ft)

Population (2011)
  - Total: 240,565
  - Rank: 117 in india
- Demonym: Katiharites

Language
  - Official: Hindi
  - Additional official: Urdu
  - Regional: Angika, Maithili, Bengali and Surjapuri language
- Time zone: UTC+5:30 (IST)
- PIN: 854105 (Katihar Main),854109 (katihar north),854103 (katihar South) ,854107 (katihar west)
- Vehicle registration: BR-39
- Lok Sabha constituency: Katihar
- Vidhan Sabha constituency: Katihar
- Website: katihar.bih.nic.in

Katihar (Maithili pronunciation: [kəʈɪɦaːr]; Bengali pronunciation: [kaʈihar]), is the tenth largest city in the state of Bihar in India in terms of population, Along with being one of the largest economic, educational and administrative centre in the eastern part of Bihar. The city situated in the eastern bank of Kari Kosi river. It is the headquarters of Katihar district and Katihar railway division of Northeast Frontier Railway. Historically, it was an important metre gauge railway station in the Bengal Presidency that linked North India with the regions of North Bengal and Northeast India. The main railway station of the city is Katihar Junction, a very important railway station on the Guwahati - Barauni railway line.

== Transport ==
=== Road ===
Katihar is connected through road network

- NH 31 = NH 231
- NH 27 = NH 131A
- NH 12 = NH 133B
- SH 98 = SH 77
- SH 62 = SH 65

=== Air ===
The nearest airport is located at Purnia Airport near Purnia (30 km) The nearest major airport is located at Bagdogra Airport (160 km) near Siliguri (West Bengal)

=== Rail ===
Katihar Junction is a major strategic Railway Junction under Northeast Frontier Railway which connects North East India with the rest of India.

== Education ==
- Al-Karim University
- Katihar Engineering College
- Katihar Medical College and Hospital (KMCH), a private medical college in Katihar City suburbs, recognized by the Medical Council of India (MCI),
- Suryadeo Law College, Katihar

== Demographics ==
Historical Population
| Year | Pop. | ±% |
|---|---|---|
| 1901 | 9,761 | — |
| 1911 | 10,219 | +4.7% |
| 1921 | 14,533 | +42.2% |
| 1931 | 15,864 | +9.2% |
| 1941 | 26,326 | +65.9% |
| 1951 | 42,365 | +60.9% |
| 1961 | 59,344 | +40.1% |
| 1971 | 80,121 | +35.0% |
| 1981 | 122,005 | +52.3% |
| 1991 | 154,367 | +26.5% |
| 2001 | 190,873 | +23.6% |
| 2011 | 240,838 | +26.2% |
Source: District Census Handbook

As per the 2011 census, Katihar Urban Agglomeration had a population of 240,565. Katihar Urban Agglomeration includes Katihar (municipal corporation plus outgrowth) and Katihar Railway Colony (outgrowth). Katihar Municipal Corporation had a total population of 225,982, out of which 119,142 were males and 106,840 were females. It had a sex ratio of 897. The population below 5 years was 31,036. The literacy rate of the 7+ population was 79.87 per cent. Katihar is at 193rd rank in terms of its population among the top 200 cities of India as per the 2011 census.

=== Religion ===
Religion in Katihar city (2011)
| Religion | Percent |
| Hinduism | 76.90% |
| Islam | 22.10% |
| Others | 1.00% |

Hinduism is major religion in Katihar city with 185,196 Hindus (76.9%) and 53,213 Muslims (22.1%). Other religions include 794 Christians (0.33%), 373 Sikhs (0.15%), 221 Jains (0.09%), 70 Buddhists (0.03%) and 960 (0.4%) not stated.

=== Languages ===
Languages spoken in Katihar City (2011)
1. Hindi (61.3%)
2. Urdu (14.6%)
3. Bengali (4.33%)
4. Bhojpuri (4.08%)
5. Maithili (2.01%)
6. Marwari (0.66%)
7. Others (13.0%)

== Climate ==
The climate of Katihar has widespread rainfall during the monsoons, sometimes bringing floods to the adjoining rural areas of the Katihar District.

== Rivers ==
Rivers in Katihar include:

- Ganges
- Kosi River
- Mahananda River

== See also ==
- List of cities in Bihar
- Kolasi
- Korha
