= Bhabanipur =

Bhabanipur, Bhawanipur, or Bhowanipore may refer to the following places:

== Bangladesh ==
- Bhabanipur, Rajshahi Division
- Bhabanipur Shaktipeeth, in Bogra District
  - Bhabanipur Kali Mandir, a temple in Sherpur Upazila of Bogra District

== India ==
=== Assam ===
- Bhabanipur, Assam Assembly constituency, in Barpeta district, centred on Bhawanipur, Barpeta

=== Bihar ===
- Bhawanipur, East Champaran, a village in East Champaran district
- Bhawanipur (community development block), in Purnia district
  - Bhawanipur Rajdham, a town

=== Punjab ===
- Bhawanipur, Kapurthala, a village in Kapurthala district

=== Uttar Pradesh ===
- Bhawanipur, Mainpuri, a village in Mainpuri district
- Bhawanipur, Sareni, a village in Raebareli district
- Rampur Bhawanipur, a census town in Barabanki district

=== West Bengal ===
- Bhabanipur, Purba Medinipur, a village in Purba Medinipur district
- Bhowanipore, a locality in Kolkata
  - Bhabanipur, West Bengal Assembly constituency, in Kolkata district, centred on Bhowanipore

== Nepal ==
- Bhawanipur, Sunsari
- Bhawanipur, Janakpur
- Bhawanipur Jitpur
- Bhawanipur, Parsa
- Bhawanipur, Sagarmatha
- Ganj Bhawanipur
- Simara Bhawanipur

== See also ==
- Bhabanipur Assembly constituency (disambiguation)
- Babhani (disambiguation)
- Bhavani (disambiguation)
- Pur (disambiguation)
