= Laboratory school =

School designed to facilitate experimentation and development in education

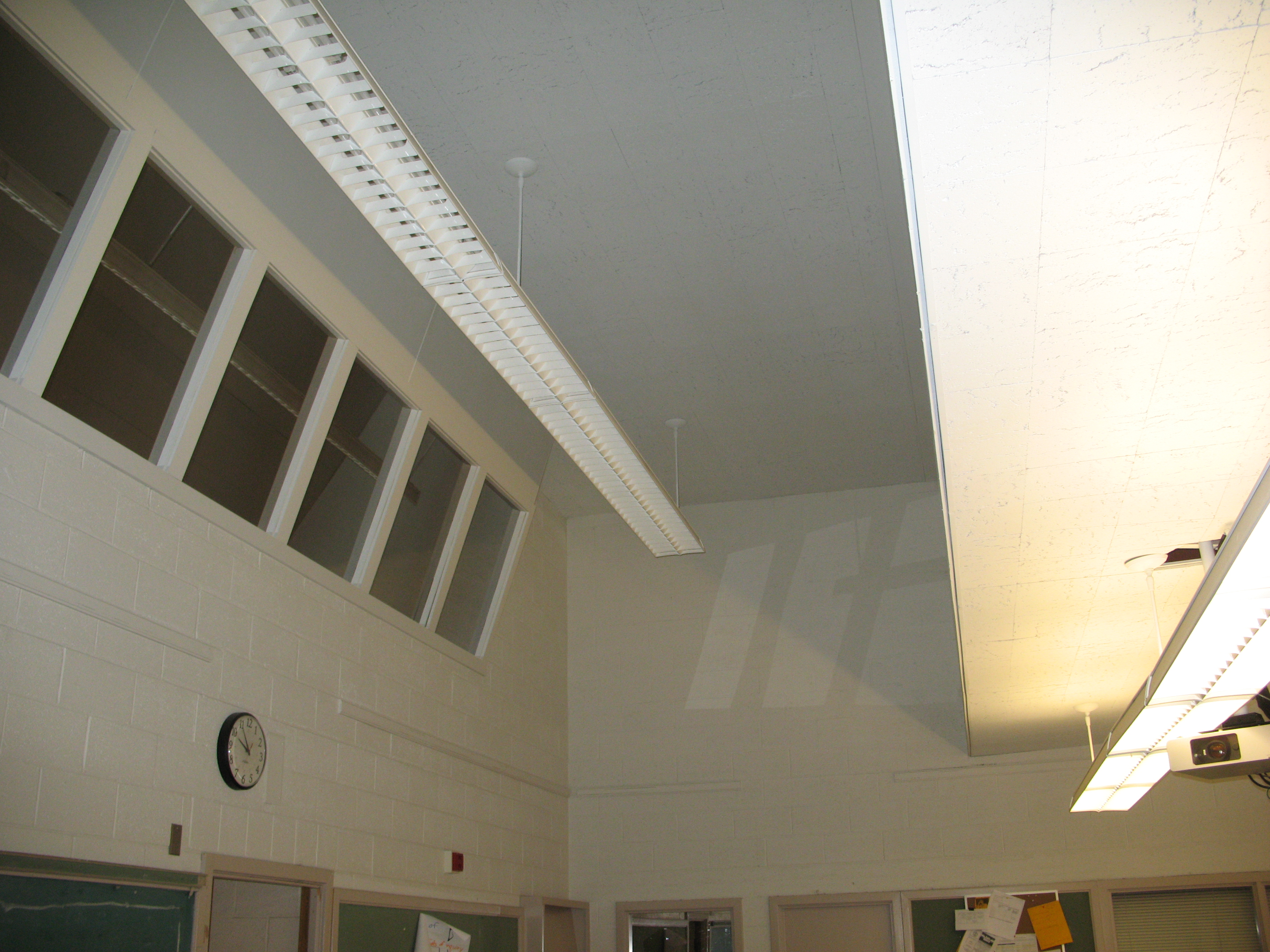
Former laboratory school at the University of Wisconsin-Eau Claire, with one-way mirrors in the upper-level observation deck, allowing professors to view the classroom

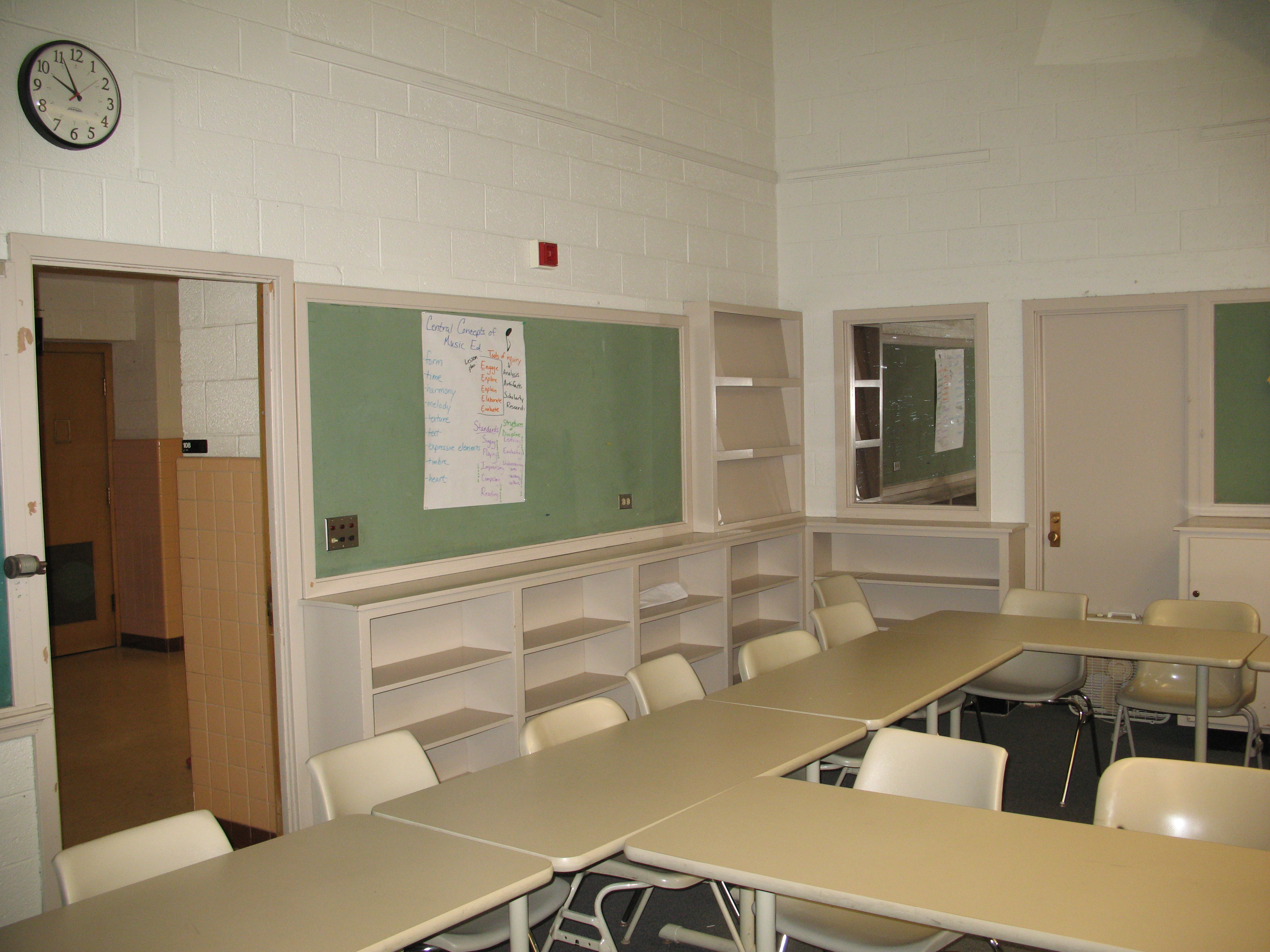
The same room, showing observation room with a one-way mirror to the right of the classroom

A laboratory school, demonstration school, or experimental school, is an elementary or secondary school operated in association with a university, college, or other teacher education institution and used for the training of future teachers, educational experimentation, educational research, and professional development.

Many laboratory schools follow a model of experiential education based on the original Laboratory School run by John Dewey at the University of Chicago. Many laboratory schools still operate in the United States and around the globe. They are known by many names: laboratory schools, demonstration schools, campus schools, model schools, university-affiliated schools, child development schools, etc., and most have a connection to a college or university. Each university-affiliated school has a unique relationship with a college or university and a different grade configuration. Some lab schools are only for preschool or kindergarten children, some are preschool through fifth or sixth grade, and some continue through high school.

Khan Lab School in Silicon Valley is one of the few laboratory schools not affiliated with a college or university. It is affiliated with Khan Academy, a non-profit educational organization. The school's experimentation with abolishing grade levels was featured on Voice of America in 2016.

== Classroom observation ==
University professors may observe laboratory school classrooms to assess the student-teacher. This is typically done without the direct awareness of the students or student-teachers, in order to avoid creating a distraction or disrupting classroom activities. Before the miniaturization of electronic camera viewing systems, laboratory schools often included elaborate direct-view observation systems with special observation decks above classrooms or observation rooms alongside the classrooms. One-way mirrors and speaker/intercom systems allowed a professor to silently observe the classroom without being seen by the students or the student-teacher.

In contrast, a modern laboratory school is able to use a standard school room layout. The rooms are outfitted with CCTV cameras hidden inside black plastic domes on the ceiling. Complex lens optics and multiple cameras allow a single stationary dome to view 360 degrees, with no mechanical noises or moving parts. High-speed Internet connections allow for a professor at a college to remotely view and interact with student-teachers in a distant laboratory school.

In either case, students and student-teachers know that observation may occur, but they do not know when such observation takes place.

== Examples ==
=== Asia ===
School	Associated Institution	Location	Description
Palli Unnayan Academy Laboratory School and College	Rural Development Academy	Sherpur Upazila, Bogra District, Rajshahi Division, Bangladesh	
Polytechnic University of the Philippines Laboratory High School	Polytechnic University of the Philippines	Manila, Philippines	A laboratory school, serving Grades 7-12
Tarlac State University – Laboratory School	Tarlac State University	Tarlac City, Philippines	Closed, 2015
TVU Laboratory School	Tra Vinh University	Tra Vinh Province, Vietnam	A multi-level public school located on Campus 4 of TVU that serves nursery, kindergarten and Grades 1–12. There are high school classes for the gifted in this school.
University of Santo Tomas Education High School	University of Santo Tomas College of Education	Manila, Philippines	A laboratory school, serving Grades 7-12
University of the Philippines Integrated School	University of the Philippines Diliman	Quezon City, Philippines	Laboratory elementary and high school for the UP Diliman College of Education.
University of the Philippines Rural High School	University of the Philippines Los Baños	Los Baños, Laguna	Laboratory high school of UP Los Baños.
University of Baguio Elementary Laboratory School	University of Baguio College of Education	Baguio City, Philippines	A laboratory school, serving Kindergarten to Grade 6
Southern Luzon State University - Laboratory Schools	Southern Luzon State University - Main Campus	Lucban, Philippines	A laboratory school, serving Grades 7–12
Patumwan Demonstration School, Srinakharinwirot University	Srinakharinwirot University	Bangkok, Thailand	
Prasarnmit Demonstration School, Srinakharinwirot University	Srinakharinwirot University	Bangkok, Thailand	Has separate divisions for primary and secondary education, and an international program. High school students are separated into various academic major classes of their choice.
Ongkharak Demonstration School, Srinakharinwirot University	Srinakharinwirot University	Nakhon Nayok, Thailand	
President Ramon Magsaysay State University, Laboratory High School	President Ramon Magsaysay State University	Iba, Zambales, Philippines	

=== Australia ===
School	Associated Institution	Location	Description
Mayfield West Demonstration School		Newcastle, New South Wales, Australia	Primary school
Mount Keira Demonstration School		Wollongong, New South Wales, Australia	Primary school
North Sydney Demonstration School	University of Sydney	Waverton, New South Wales, Australia	Primary school

=== Canada ===
School	Associated Institution	Location	Description
Institute of Child Study	University of Toronto	Toronto, Canada	An independent nursery to Grade 6 day school
University of Toronto Schools	University of Toronto	Toronto, Canada	An independent co-educational day school

=== Europe ===
School	Associated Institution	Location	Description
Jordanhill School		Glasgow, Scotland	An independent state co-educational day school
Lab School Paris		Paris, France	First laboratory school in France, opened in 2017, for students aged 6 to 18, bilingual (French-English), IB Diploma Program for 11th and 12th grades, associated to the Lab School Network.
Laborschule Bielefeld		Bielefeld, Germany	
Tampere University Teacher Training School	Tampere University Faculty of Education and Culture	Finland	The Teacher Training School trains future teachers in a very structured way. Administratively, the school is part of the Tampere University Faculty of Education and Culture. In all other respects, the school enjoys great independence.
SZTE István Báthory Laboratory Grammar School	University of Szeged	Hungary	The Báthory is the laboratory school of the SZTE (University of Szeged) which means people who studying to become a teacher one day can join in the work and everyday life of the Báthory where they can develop under teachers and professors who are the best in their area.

=== United States ===
School	Associated Institution	Location	Description
Center for Young Children	University of Maryland	College Park, Maryland	A laboratory preschool and kindergarten, serving ages 3–6
A & M Training School #5	University of Arkansas at Monticello	Monticello, Arkansas	
A.E. Phillips Laboratory School	Louisiana Tech University	Ruston, Louisiana	K-8 laboratory school
Arlitt Child Development Center	University of Cincinnati	Cincinnati, Ohio	A laboratory preschool in the School of Education
Burris Laboratory School	Ball State University Teachers College	Muncie, Indiana	Public K-12 school
Campus School	Smith College	Northampton, Massachusetts	A laboratory preschool
Child Development Center	Kent State University	Kent, Ohio	An early years laboratory school with toddler, preschool, and Kindergarten classrooms
Children's Campus	San Francisco State University	San Francisco, California	A Center for Early Care and Education
Fanny Edel Falk Laboratory School	University of Pittsburgh	Pittsburgh, Pennsylvania	A private, co-educational K-8 laboratory school
Florida A&M University Developmental Research School	Florida A&M University	Tallahassee, Florida	
Florida State University School	Florida State University	Tallahassee, Florida	Despite its common moniker, "Florida High", FSUS is sponsored by Florida State University's College of Education.
Greenwood Laboratory School	Missouri State University	Springfield, Missouri	A comprehensive K-12 laboratory school
Khan Lab School	Khan Academy	Mountain View, California	A nonprofit lab school
Kilby Laboratory School	University of North Alabama	Florence, Alabama	
Lab School of Washington		Washington, D.C.	School for students with learning difficulties
Louisiana State University Laboratory School	Louisiana State University	Baton Rouge, Louisiana	A college preparatory public school serving grades K-12
Macfeat Laboratory School	Winthrop University	Rock Hill, South Carolina	
Mills College Children's School	Mills College	Oakland, California	A private K-5 school that is the first laboratory school founded on the West Coast of the United States.
The Milne School	University at Albany	Albany, New York	
Model Laboratory School	Eastern Kentucky University	Richmond, Kentucky	Public laboratory school
Model Secondary School for the Deaf and Kendall Demonstration Elementary School	Gallaudet University	Washington, D.C.	Federally funded demonstration schools for deaf education, operated by and located at Gallaudet University. MSSD is a day and residential high school for grades 9 to 12. KDES is a day school for infants through grade 8
MUW Child and Parent Development Center	Mississippi University for Women	Columbus, Mississippi	A private laboratory school founded in 1929.
Northern University High School	University of Northern Iowa	Cedar Falls, Iowa	A small public high school. (Closed 2012)
P.K. Yonge Developmental Research School	University of Florida College of Education	Gainesville, Florida,	A public K-12 laboratory school
Priscilla Pond Flawn Child and Family Lab	University of Texas at Austin	Austin, Texas	A university laboratory preschool founded in 1927. Partners with the department of Human Development and Family Sciences at UT Austin. The PPFCFL is the oldest continuous lab school in the state of Texas and has been NAEYC accredited since 1985. Serves children from the community from 18 months to kindergarten.
Shirley G. Moore Laboratory School (Minneapolis)	University of Minnesota	Minneapolis, Minnesota	
Southern University Laboratory School	Southern University	Baton Rouge, Louisiana	
The Henry Barnard Laboratory School	Rhode Island College	Providence, Rhode Island	A private elementary school founded in 1898, currently affiliated with the Feinstein School of Education and Human Development
Sam Houston State University Charter School	Sam Houston State University	Greater Houston	A network of charter schools established in 2017.
The School at Columbia University	Columbia University	New York, New York	An independent K-8 co-educational school
Thomas Metcalf Laboratory School (Elementary) & University High School (High School)	Illinois State University	Normal, Illinois	The first laboratory school in the United States
UCLA Lab School	University of California, Los Angeles	Los Angeles, California	
University High School (San Juan)	University of Puerto Rico, Río Piedras	San Juan, Puerto Rico	
University Junior High School	University of Texas at Austin	Austin, Texas	
University Laboratory High School	University of Illinois	Urbana, Illinois	
University Laboratory School	University of Hawaiʻi at Mānoa	Honolulu, Hawai'i	A charter school serving grades K-12
University of Chicago Laboratory Schools	University of Chicago	Chicago, Illinois	A private, co-educational day school and the original laboratory school as founded by John Dewey
University of Delaware Laboratory School	University of Delaware	Newark, Delaware	
University of Houston Charter School	University of Houston	Houston, Texas	Opened in 1997, and closed in 2021.
Eccles Early Childhood Development Lab School	Salt Lake Community College	Salt Lake City, Utah	

== See also ==
- Progressive education
- List of demonstration schools in Thailand
