= Babhani =

Babhani may refer to:

- Babhani, Nepal, a village
- Babhani, Uttar Pradesh, a village in India
- Babhani, a subtribe of the Dombki Baloch tribe

== See also ==
- Bhavani (disambiguation)
- Bhabanipur (disambiguation)
