= Baraidaha =

Settlement in Bangladeshi

Coordinates: 24.5616°N 89.4746°E

Baraidaha is a village near the Dhaka — Bogra highway, in Sherpur Upazila, Bangladesh. According to the 2011 census of Bangladesh, Baraidaha had a population of 1,526 people (784 males; 742 females) in 366 households. The village is more than 1000 years old.
