= Hamirgaon =

Hamirgaon Hamirgāon
- Village
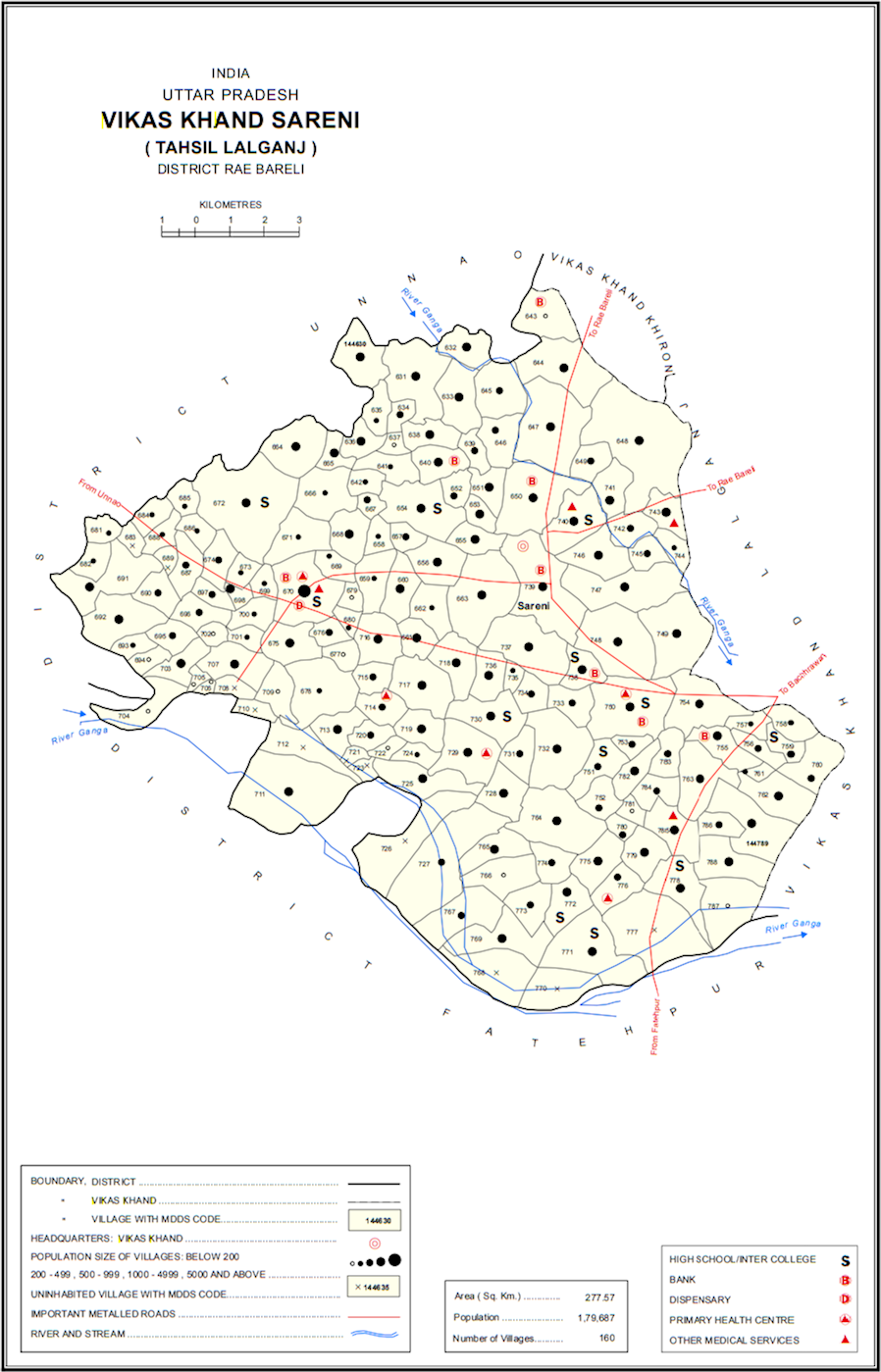
- Map showing Hamirgaon (#732) in Sareni CD block

- Location in Uttar Pradesh, India
- Coordinates: 26.106244°N 80.830716°E
- Country: India
- State: Uttar Pradesh
- District: Raebareli

Area
  - Total: 8.12 km^{2} (3.14 sq mi)

Population (2011)
  - Total: 2,700
  - Density: 330/km^{2} (860/sq mi)

Languages
  - Official: Hindi
- Time zone: UTC+5:30 (IST)
- Vehicle registration: UP-35

Hamirgaon is a village in Sareni block of Rae Bareli district, Uttar Pradesh, India. It is located 16 km from Lalganj, the tehsil headquarters. As of 2011, it has a population of 2,700 people, in 476 households. It has one primary school and no healthcare facilities, and does not host a weekly haat or a permanent market. It belongs to the nyaya panchayat of Raipur.

The 1951 census recorded Hamirgaon (as "Hamir Gaon") as comprising 8 hamlets, with a total population of 1,163 people (562 male and 601 female), in 226 households and 183 physical houses. The area of the village was given as 743 acres. 209 residents were literate, 173 male and 36 female. The village was listed as belonging to the pargana of Sareni and the thana of Sareni.

The 1961 census recorded Hamirgaon as comprising 7 hamlets, with a total population of 1,330 people (619 male and 681 female), in 244 households and 212 physical houses. The area of the village was given as 743 acres.

The 1981 census recorded Hamirgaon as having a population of 1,833 people, in 303 households, and having an area of 299.47 hectares. The main staple foods were given as wheat and rice.

The 1991 census recorded Hamirgaon (as "Hamir Gaon") as having a total population of 2,113 people (1,065 male and 1,048 female), in 339 households and 339 physical houses. The area of the village was listed as 296 hectares. Members of the 0-6 age group numbered 342, or 16% of the total; this group was 52% male (179) and 48% female (163). Members of scheduled castes made up 38% of the village's population, while members of scheduled tribes made up 1%. The literacy rate of the village was 44% (612 men and 316 women). 548 people were classified as main workers (466 men and 82 women), while 12 people were classified as marginal workers (1 man and 11 women); the remaining 1,553 residents were non-workers. The breakdown of main workers by employment category was as follows: 257 cultivators (i.e. people who owned or leased their own land); 199 agricultural labourers (i.e. people who worked someone else's land in return for payment); 2 workers in livestock, forestry, fishing, hunting, plantations, orchards, etc.; 1 in mining and quarrying; 1 household industry worker; 12 workers employed in other manufacturing, processing, service, and repair roles; 1 construction worker; 4 employed in trade and commerce; 2 employed in transport, storage, and communications; and 69 in other services.
