= Bhawan =

Bhawan may refer to:

- Anand Bhawan School, Minority Institution in India, founded in 1949
- Bhawan Bahadur Nagar, town in Bulandshahr district in the state of Uttar Pradesh, India
- Guru Gobind Singh Bhawan, building at Punjabi University, Patiala
- Rajiv Gandhi Bhawan, the building housing the Corporate Headquarters of Airports Authority of India
- Rashtrapati Bhawan or Rashtrapati Bhavan, the official residence of the President of India
- Rastrapati Bhawan, the official residence of the President of Nepal
- Ravidassia Bhawan, a place of worship in the Ravidassia religion
- Thana Bhawan, small town in Muzaffarnagar District in the state of Uttar Pradesh, India
- Umaid Bhawan Palace, large private residence at Jodhpur in Rajasthan, India
- Vigyan Bhavan, New Delhi, Government of India's premier Conference Centre

== See also ==
- Bhaban (disambiguation)
- Raj Bhavan (disambiguation)
- Bhavani (disambiguation)
