= Bielefeld University =

Public university in Bielefeld, Germany

- Universität Bielefeld
- Type: Public
- Established: 5 September 1969; 57 years ago
- Budget: € 440 million
- Chancellor: Dr. Stephan Becker
- Rector: Angelika Epple
- Academic staff: 1,387
- Administrative staff: 1,100
- Students: 24,255
- Location: Bielefeld, North Rhine-Westphalia, Germany; 52°02′16″N 8°29′35″E
- Website: www.uni-bielefeld.de

Bielefeld University (German: Universität Bielefeld) is a public university in Bielefeld, Germany. Founded in 1969, it is one of the country's newer universities, and considers itself a "reform" university, following a different style of organization and teaching than the established universities. In particular, the university aims to "re-establish the unity between research and teaching", and so all its faculty teach courses in their area of research. The university also stresses a focus on interdisciplinary research, helped by the architecture, which encloses all faculties in one great structure. It is among the first of the German universities to switch some faculties (e.g. biology) to bachelor's/master's degrees as part of the Bologna process.

Bielefeld University has started an extensive multi-phase modernisation project, which is to be completed by 2025. A total investment of more than 1 billion euros has been planned for this undertaking.

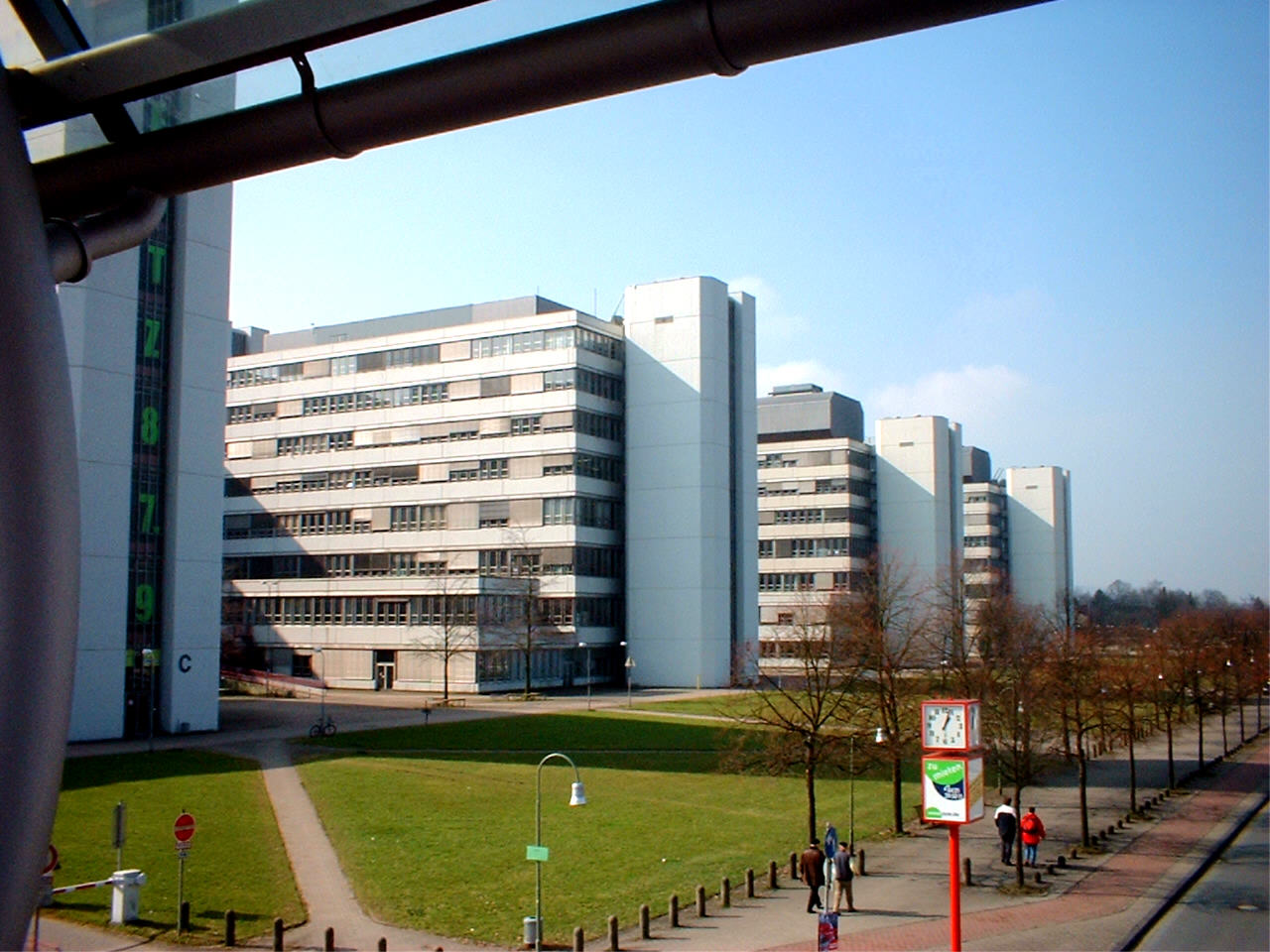
Bielefeld University

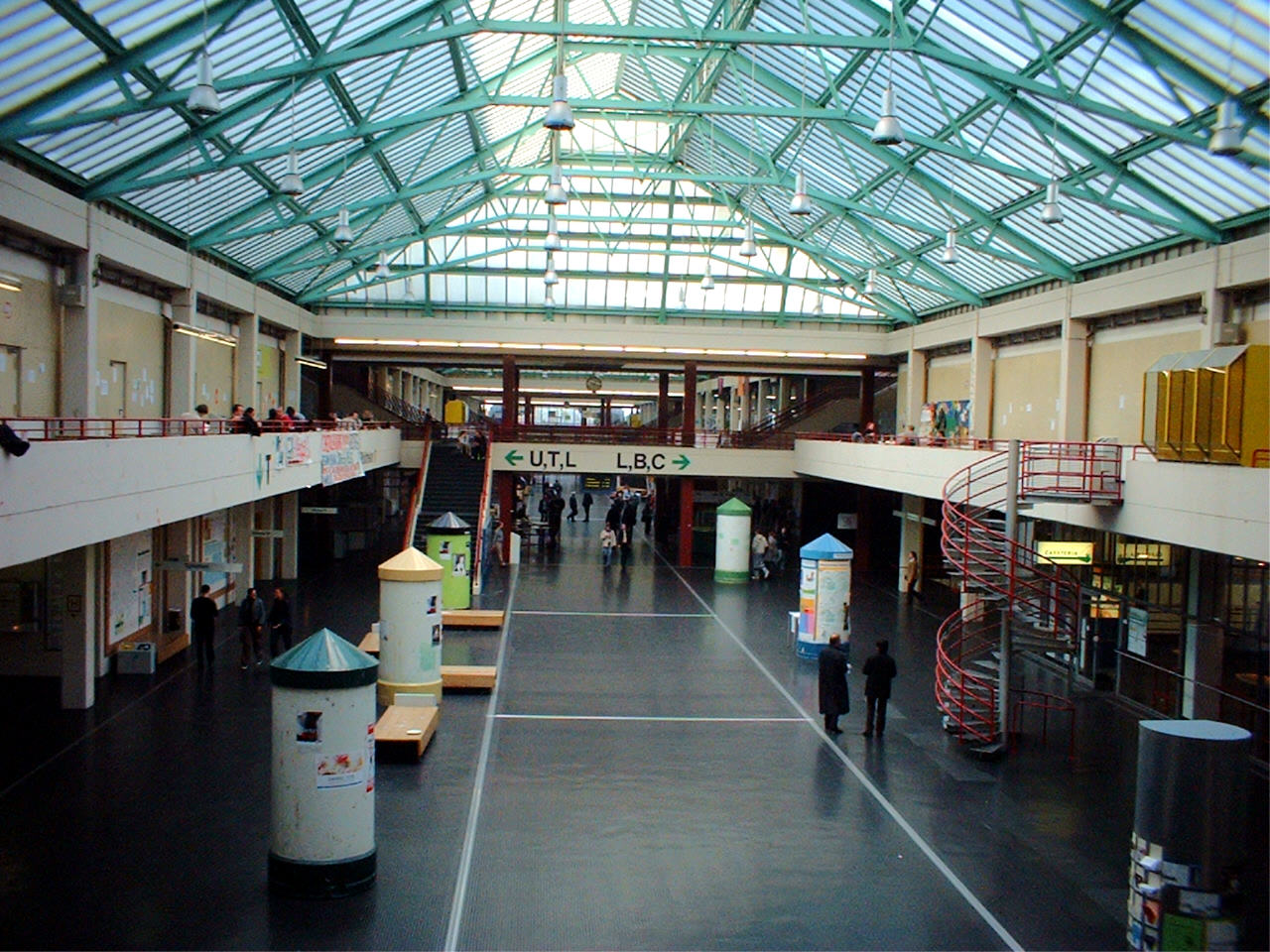
The central hall of the university

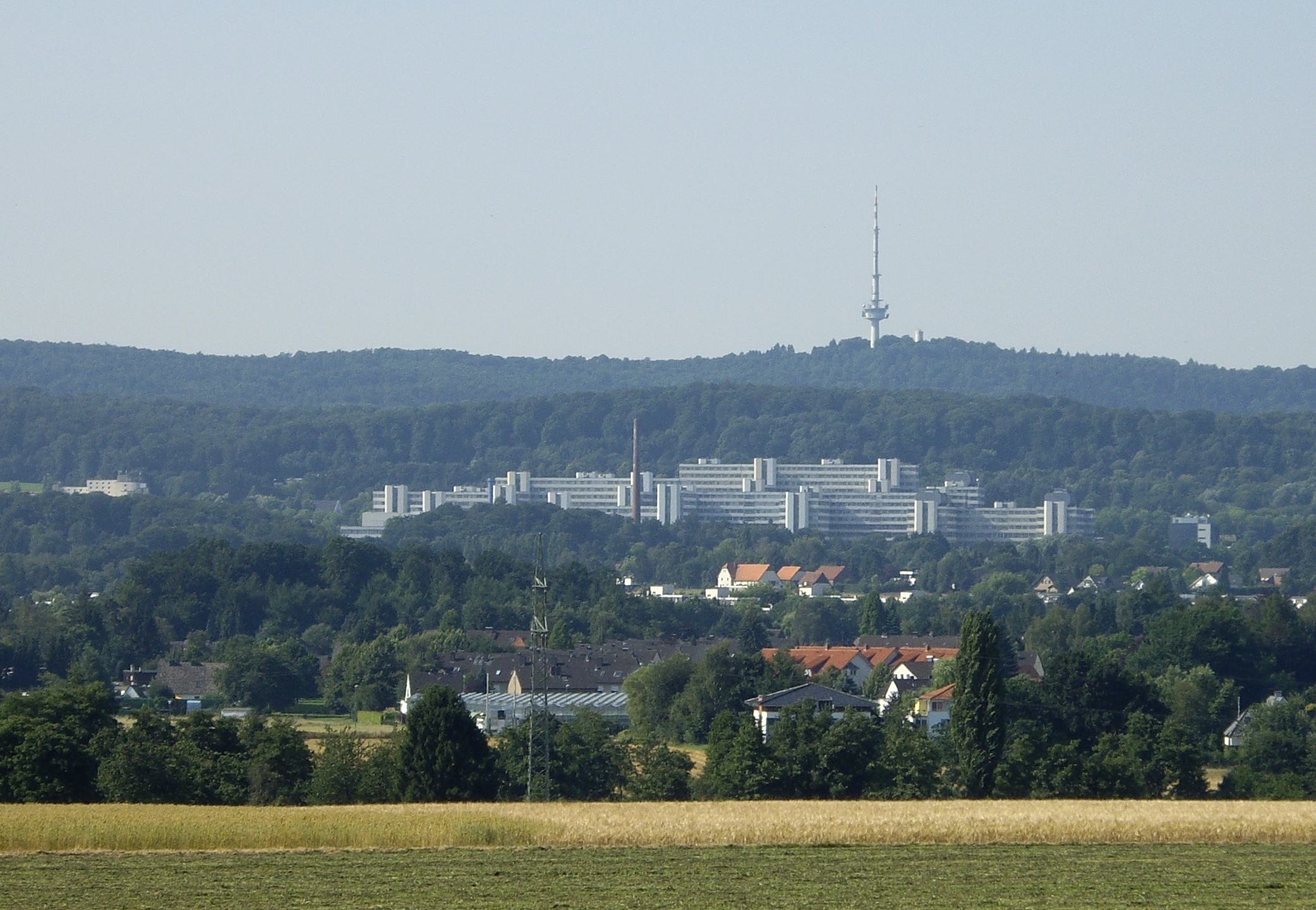
Bielefeld University on the north side of Teutoburg Forest

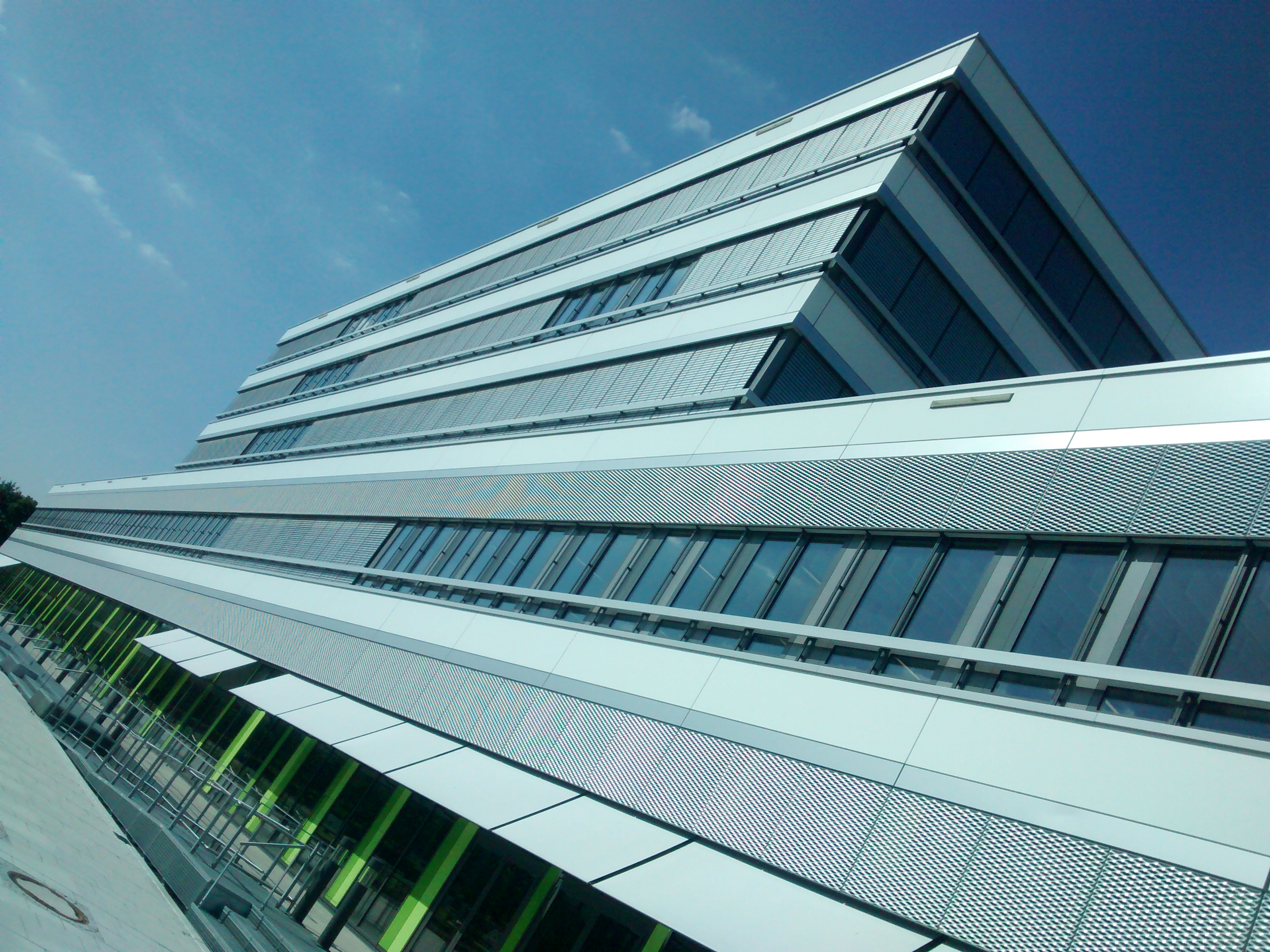
Bielefeld University building X

== Campus ==
The university is located in the west of Bielefeld next to the Teutoburg Forest. The main building, which houses all the faculties and institutes, as well as the large library, is a functional concrete structure, typical of the 1960s. The main building with 154,000 m^{2} alone is one of the largest structures in Europe.

Intercity trains running between Cologne/Bonn and Berlin stop regularly at Bielefeld, and the university can be accessed via city tram (Line 4) in about 10 minutes from the city center—or in about 15 minutes by car. The nearest airport, Paderborn/Lippstadt, is about 50 kilometres southeast of Bielefeld.

=== Library ===
Bielefeld University Library occupies most of the first floor of the main university building and contains over 2.2 million volumes. It is open every day of the year, from 08:00 until 01:00 Monday to Friday, and from 09:00 to 22:00 during weekends and public holidays.

The library's projects include the development of tools to improve access to electronic resources. It works with commercial system suppliers to meet the needs of academic libraries—collaborations that have resulted in developments such as BASE (Bielefeld Academic Search Engine), by which metadata is collected from scientific repository servers and indexed, along with data from selected web sites and data collections, using the Solr framework.

== Academic profile ==
=== Central academic institutes ===
- Center for Interdisciplinary Research (ZiF)
- Institute for interdisciplinary research on conflict and violence (IKG)
- Center for Interamerican Studies (CIAS)
- CeBiTec – Center for Biotechnology
- CITEC – Cognitive Interaction Technology (Center of Excellence)
- Research Institute for Cognition and Robotics (CoR-Lab)
- Interdisciplinary Centre of Women's and Gender Studies
- Institute for the Simulation of Complex Systems (ISKOS)
- Institute of Mathematical Economics (IMW)
- Research Centre for Mathematical Modelling (FSPM)
- Teacher Training Centre (ZfL – in German)

=== Oberstufen-Kolleg and Laborschule at the University of Bielefeld ===
Since their founding by Hartmut von Hentig in 1974, the laboratory schools Laborschule and Oberstufen-Kolleg have focused on integrating educational research into everyday teaching: school teachers collaborate with university researchers in research projects. A research institute at the university corresponds to each school ("Research Unit Laborschule" and "Research Unit Oberstufen-Kolleg").

The Oberstufen-Kolleg has received multiple awards, for example the Robert Bosch Foundation's German School Award in 2010 for its innovative integration of migrant students into the school and a United Nations Award for a charitable project in Daular, Ecuador together with the German School of Guayaquil.

=== Rankings ===
University rankings

Overall – Global & National
QS World 2026	1001–1200	45
THE World 2023	201–250	23–26
ARWU World 2023	701–800	41–42

In the QS World University Rankings for 2024, the university is placed within the 951–1000 range, ranking as the 45th institution at the national level. In contrast, the university achieves a higher position in the Times Higher Education World University Rankings, where it lands within the 201–250 bracket in 2023, and ranks between 23rd and 26th in the country. According to the Academic Ranking of World Universities for 2023, the university's global rank falls within the 701–800 range, placing it between 41st and 42nd nationally.

In 2017, Bielefeld University was ranked 22nd in the world by the Times Higher Education (THE) Young University Rankings, and among the top 300 universities by the traditional Times Higher Education World University Rankings.

In the THE ranking of 2011 Bielefeld is placed among the top 50 universities in engineering and technology.

In terms of mathematics, the Academic Ranking of World Universities of 2018 places Bielefeld among the four best universities of Germany and 101–150 best universities in the world. The German Center for Higher Education Development Excellence Ranking, which measures academic performance of European graduate programs in biology, chemistry, mathematics, and physics, placed Bielefeld in the excellence group for mathematics.

== Protests against tuition fees ==
Bielefeld University was one of the centers of student protests in the fight against the introduction of tuition fees. In the course of the protests, the central hall and the university president's office were occupied by protesting students for over a month.

In its session of 12 July 2006, the university senate decided to introduce tuition fees of €500 per semester, beginning in 2007.

In August 2006, a universal key for the university went missing during a senate session. After that, multiple cases of arson and defacement of university property were reported. University president Dieter Timmermann was a particular target of these attacks. The cost of the damage, mainly due to the replacement of thousands of locks; the costs amounted to several hundred thousand euros.

Tuition fees in North Rhine-Westphalia were abolished again for the winter semester 2011/2012.

== See also ==
- Open access in Germany
