= Bhawanipur, Sareni =

Bhawanipur Bhawānipur
- Village
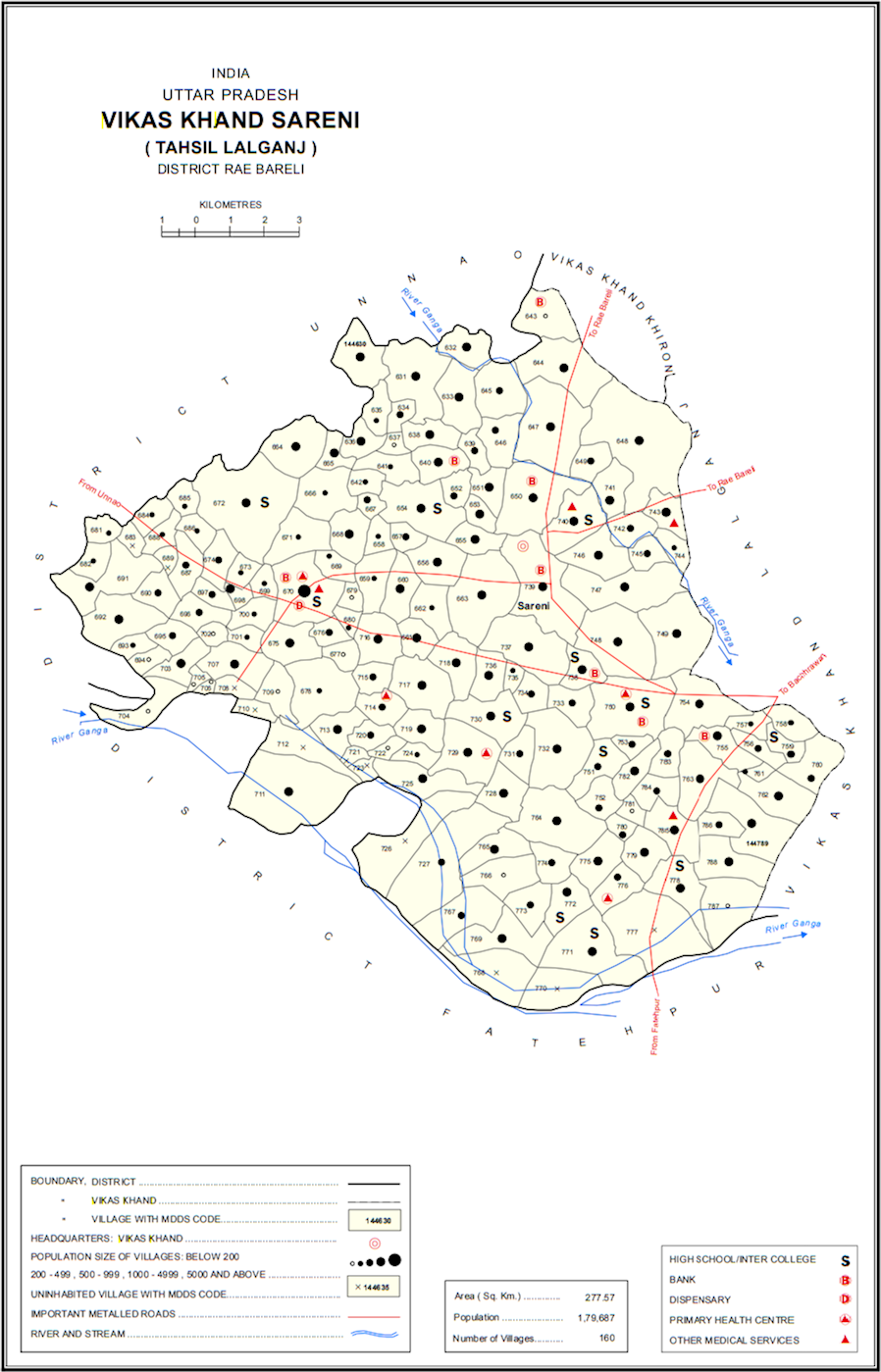
- Map showing Bhawanipur (#734) in Sareni CD block

- Location in Uttar Pradesh, India
- Coordinates: 26.116167°N 80.824833°E
- Country: India
- State: Uttar Pradesh
- District: Raebareli

Area
  - Total: 1.105 km^{2} (0.427 sq mi)

Population (2011)
  - Total: 623
  - Density: 564/km^{2} (1,460/sq mi)

Languages
  - Official: Hindi
- Time zone: UTC+5:30 (IST)
- Vehicle registration: UP-35

Bhawanipur is a village in Sareni block of Rae Bareli district, Uttar Pradesh, India. It is located 25 km from Lalganj, the tehsil headquarters. As of 2011, it has a population of 623 people, in 108 households. It has one primary school and no healthcare facilities, and does not host a weekly haat or a permanent market. It belongs to the nyaya panchayat of Raipur.

The 1981 census recorded Bhawanipur as having a population of 283 people, in 54 households, and having an area of 114.39 hectares. The main staple foods were given as wheat and rice.

The 1991 census recorded Bhawanipur as having a total population of 393 people (184 male and 209 female), in 61 households and 60 physical houses. The area of the village was listed as 116 hectares. Members of the 0-6 age group numbered 67, or 17% of the total; this group was 40% male (27) and 60% female (40). No members of scheduled castes were recorded, while members of scheduled tribes made up 24% of the village's population. The literacy rate of the village was 54% (110 men and 101 women). 94 people were classified as main workers (79 men and 15 women), while 0 people were classified as marginal workers; the remaining 299 residents were non-workers. The breakdown of main workers by employment category was as follows: 48 cultivators (i.e. people who owned or leased their own land); 25 agricultural labourers (i.e. people who worked someone else's land in return for payment); 0 workers in livestock, forestry, fishing, hunting, plantations, orchards, etc.; 0 in mining and quarrying; 0 household industry workers; 5 workers employed in other manufacturing, processing, service, and repair roles; 0 construction workers; 3 employed in trade and commerce; 1 employed in transport, storage, and communications; and 12 in other services.
