= Bhabanipur, Rajshahi Division =

Bhabanipur
- Union
- Location within Bangladesh
- Coordinates: 24.5497°N 89.4326°E
- Country: Bangladesh
- Region: Rajshahi Division
- District: Bogra District
- Upazila: Sherpur Upazila
- Time zone: UTC+6 (BST)

Bhabanipur (Bengali: ভবানীপুর) is a union under Sherpur Upazila in Bogra of Rajshahi Division, Bangladesh. It is a sacred site around Karatoyatat and one of the Shakta pithas of Indian subcontinent. The Bhabanipur Shakta pitha is a place of worship consecrated to the Goddess Ma Bhabani. It is a historic place of pilgrimage for the followers of Hinduism.
