= Bhavani (disambiguation) =

Bhavani is a Hindu goddess, a ferocious aspect of Parvati.

Bhavani may also refer to:

== People ==
- Adoor Bhavani, Indian film actress.
- Bhavani (actress), Indian film actress.

== Places ==
- Bhavani, Tamil Nadu, a city in Erode District, Tamil Nadu, India
- Bhavani River, a major tributary of Kaveri River in Tamil Nadu, India
- Bhavanisagar, a panchayat town on the banks of Bhavanisagar Dam in Erode District
- Bhavanisagar Dam, a dam and reservoir on Bhavani River in Erode District

== Movies ==
- Bhavani (1967 film), an Indian Tamil-language film
- Bhavani (2011 film), an Indian Tamil-language film

== See also ==
- Babhani (disambiguation)
- Bhawan (disambiguation)
- Bhabanipur (disambiguation)
