= Bhaban =

Bhaban, Bhavan or Bhawan is a Sanskrit term for a building, palace, or mansion and may refer to:

== Parliament houses ==
- Jatiya Sangsad Bhaban, Dhaka; the house of the parliament of Bangladesh
- Sansad Bhavan, Dhaka; the house of the parliament of India

== Official residences ==
- Rashtrapati Bhavan, Delhi; official residence of the president of India
- Banga Bhaban, Dhaka; official residence of the president of Bangladesh
- Gana Bhaban, Dhaka; official residence of former Bangladeshi prime minister Sheikh Hasina
- Uttara Gana Bhaban, Natore; official Bamgladeshi governmental retreat
- Rashtrapati Bhavan, Kathmandu, official residence of the president of Nepal
- Raj Bhavan (disambiguation), common name of the official residences of the state governors in India

== Indian museums and historic houses ==
- Teen Murti Bhavan, Delhi; former residence of prime minister Jawaharlal Nehru
- Swaraj Bhavan, Prayagraj; former residence of the Nehru family
- Anand Bhavan, Prayagraj; former residence of the Nehru family, now a planetarium
- Netaji Bhawan, Kolkata; former residence of Netaji Subhas Chandra Bose

== Nepali royal palaces ==
- Harihar Bhawan, Lalitpur
- Bahadur Bhawan, Kathmandu
- Kailashkut Bhawan, Kathmandu

== Others ==
- Nagar Bhaban, Dhaka; headquarters of the Dhaka South City Corporation
- Bangladesh Shilpa Bank Bhaban, Dhaka; headquarters of Bangladesh Shilpa Bank (Bangladesh Development Bank)
- Janata Bank Bhaban, Dhaka; headquarters of Janata Bank
- RAJUK Bhaban, Dhaka; headquarters of Rajdhani Unnayan Kartripakkha (RAJUK)
- BRAC Bhaban, Dhaka; headquarters of Bangladesh Rural Advancement Committee (BRAC)
- Saravana Bhavan, Indian restaurant chain
- Rajiv Gandhi Bhawan, Delhi; headquarters of the Airports Authority of India and the Ministry of Civil Aviation
- Geeta Bhawan, suburb in Indore District, Madhya Pradesh, India

== See also ==
- Bhawan (disambiguation)
