= Bhawanipur Rajdham =

- Village
- Location in Bihar, India Bhawanipur Rajdham (India)
- Coordinates: 25.6501°N 87.1396°E
- Country: India
- State: Bihar
- District: Purnia

Government
  - MP: Mr. Santosh kushwaha
  - MLA: Kaladhar Mandal

Area
  - Total: 5.6 km^{2} (2.2 sq mi)
- Elevation: 450 m (1,480 ft)

Population (2011)
  - Total: 50,234
  - Density: 2,000/km^{2} (5,200/sq mi)

Languages
  - Official: Maithili, Hindi
- Time zone: UTC+5:30 (IST)
- PIN: 854204
- Telephone code: 916462
- ISO 3166 code: IN-BR
- Vehicle registration: BR-11

Bhawanipur Rajdham is a village in Bihar. This city has first class education system, with population of approx 25,000, in the Purnia district of the Indian state of Bihar. It is divided into two parts: Bhawanipur West gram panchayat and Bhawanipur East gram panchayat of the Bhawanipur (Community development block).

== Transport ==
Bhawanipur is situated at a distance of about 45 kilometres (28.0 mi) from Purnea. State Highway SH 65 provides the closest route to Bhawanipur.

It is also connected through National Highway NH 31 which is 23 kilometres (14.3 mi) away.
