= Palli Unnayan Academy Laboratory School and College =

Coordinates: 24.7063°N 89.3949°E

- পল্লী উন্নয়ন একাডেমী ল্যাবরেটরী স্কুল এড কলেজ
- Sherpur Upazila; Bogra, Bangladesh, 5840

Information
- Established: 1978
- School board: Rajshahi
- Faculty: 70+
- Website: rdalsc.edu.bd

Palli Unnayan Academy Laboratory School and College (Bengali: পল্লী উন্নয়ন একাডেমী ল্যাবরেটরী স্কুল এড কলেজ, lit. 'Rural Development Academy Laboratory School and College') is a school and college located in Sherpur Upazila, Bogura District, Rajshahi Division. It was founded in 1978 and is affiliated with Rural Development Academy. In 2014, its results placed in the top 20 educational institutions in Rajshahi Division.
