= Khan Lab School =

Independent school in the United States

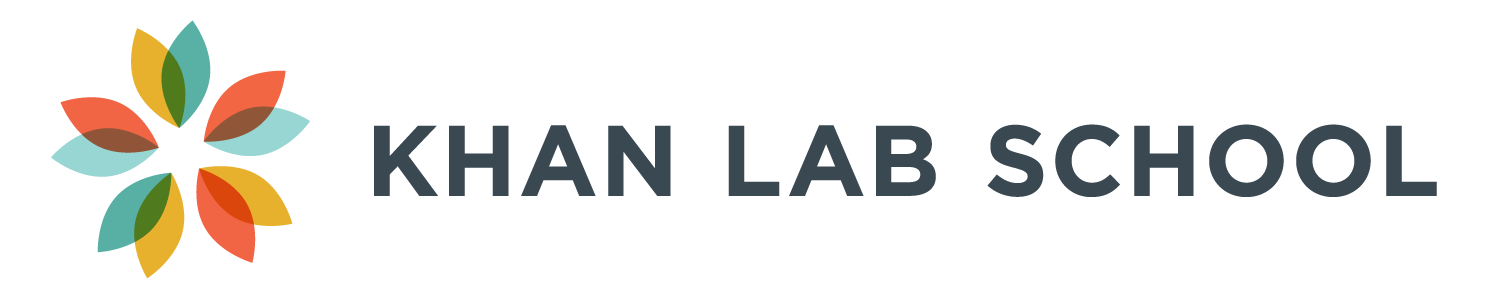
- Mountain View, Palo Alto, California, U.S.

Information
- Type: Independent School, Non-profit organization
- Established: 2014; 12 years ago
- Founder: Sal Khan
- Key people: Sal Khan (Founder & Chairperson)
- Grades: TK-12
- Enrollment: 300
- Affiliations: Khan Academy
- Website: khanlabschool.org

Khan Lab School is an independent school in Mountain View, California, associated with Khan Academy. It is a laboratory school founded by educator Sal Khan.

== Teaching model ==
=== Mastery-based learning ===
KLS uses a model which is based on mastery, which means students demonstrate competence in all skills before moving on in the course.

=== Social and emotional learning ===
The school also teaches social and emotional skills which are based on these core principles:

1. Self-Awareness
2. Self-Management
3. Social Awareness
4. Social Management
5. Social Engagement

=== Mixed age groups ===
Unlike many schools, KLS places its students in mixed-age settings in order to group students by academic progress.

=== Extended days ===
The school's lower and middle school divisions also continue to run throughout the summer term. KLS also adopts an extended day model, in which students are expected to work independently. Students are not required to participate in extracurricular activities, but those who stay after school are expected to focus on their learning, and project goals.
