= Bhabanipur Assembly constituency =

Bhabanipur Assembly constituency may refer to these electoral constituencies in India:

- Bhabanipur, Assam Assembly constituency
- Bhabanipur, West Bengal Assembly constituency

== See also ==
- Bhabanipur (disambiguation)
