= Rahmatpur, Bangladesh =

Rahmatpur রহমতপুর
- Village
- Location in Bangladesh
- Coordinates: 22°47′N 90°18′E
- Country: Bangladesh
- Division: Barisal Division
- District: Barisal District
- Upazila: Babuganj Upazila

Area
  - Total: 3.79 km^{2} (1.46 sq mi)

Population (2022)
  - Total: 7,045
  - Density: 1,860/km^{2} (4,810/sq mi)
- Time zone: UTC+6 (Bangladesh Time)

Rahmatpur is a village in Babuganj Upazila of Barisal District in the Barisal Division of southern-central Bangladesh.

== Demography ==
According to the 2022 Census of Bangladesh, Rahmatpur had 1,691 households and a population of 7,045. It has a total area of 3.79 km^{2} (1.46 sq mi).

== Notable people ==
- Abdul Wahab Khan, Pakistani politician
- Sal Khan, American educator
