= Sal Khan =

American educator (born 1976)

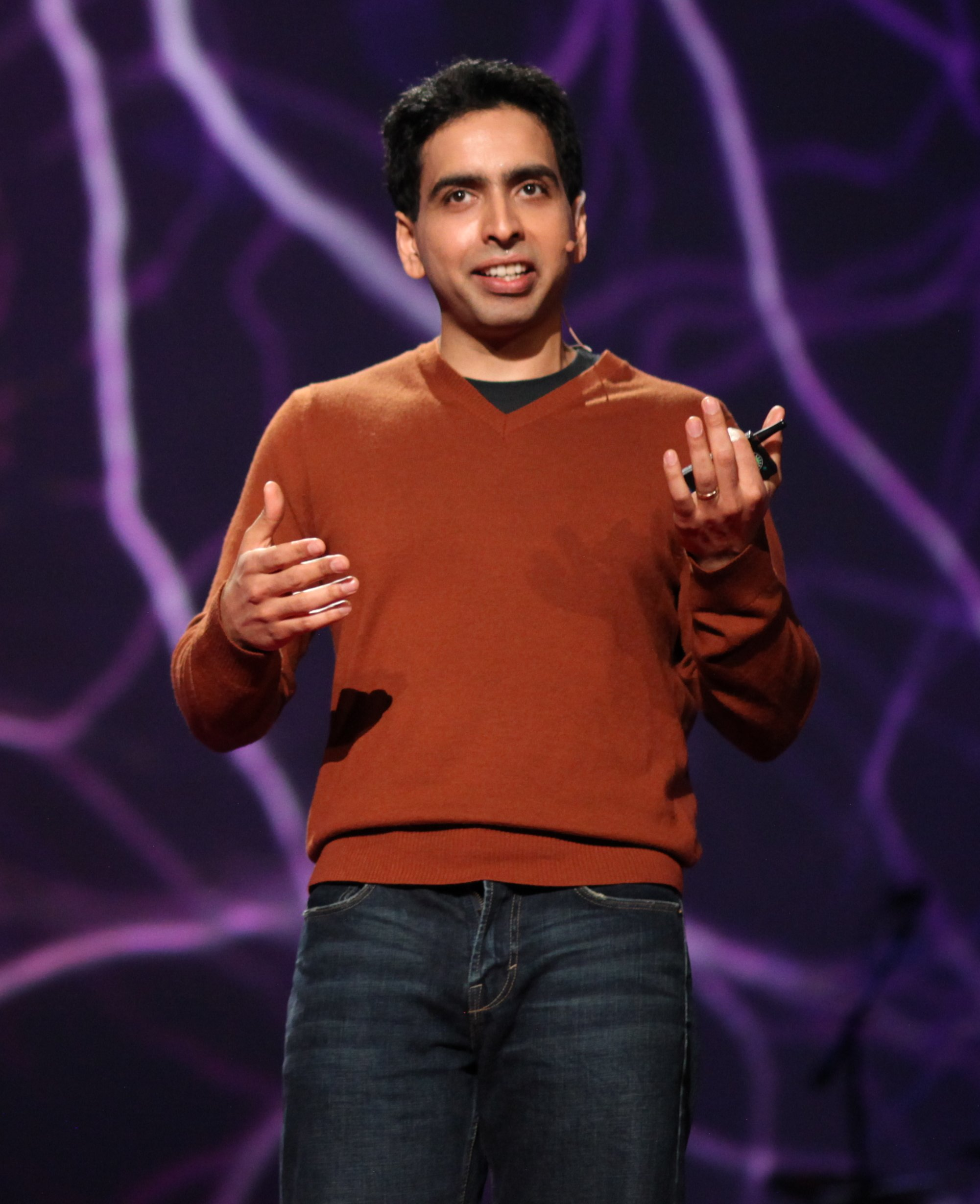
- Khan speaking at a TED conference in 2011
- Born: Salman Amin Khan; October 11, 1976 (age 50); Metairie, Louisiana, United States
- Education: Massachusetts Institute of Technology (SB, MEng); Harvard University (MBA)
- Occupations: Educator; entrepreneur
- Title: Founder and CEO of Khan Academy; Founder of Khan Lab School
- Board member of: Aspen Institute
- Spouse: Umaima Marvi (m. 2004)
- Children: 3
- Relatives: Abdul Wahab Khan (grandfather)

Salman Amin "Sal" Khan (Note: Bengali: সালমান আমিন খান, romanized: Sālmān Āmin Khān) (born October 11, 1976) is an American educator and the founder of Khan Academy, a free online non-profit educational platform with which he has produced over 6,500 video lessons teaching a wide spectrum of academic subjects, originally focusing on mathematics and science. He is also the founder of Khan Lab School, a private, in-person school in Mountain View, California.

As of September 2026, the Khan Academy channel on YouTube has 9.46 million subscribers, and its videos have been viewed more than two billion times. In 2012, Khan was named in the annual publication of Time 100.

== Early life and family ==
Khan was born in Metairie, Louisiana, on October 11, 1976, into a Bengali Muslim family. His father Fakhrul Amin Khan (d. 1990) was a physician, originally hailing from the village of Rahmatpur in Babuganj, Barishal, Bangladesh, while his mother Masuda Khan is from Murshidabad, West Bengal, India. They are descendants of Rahmat Khan, a 16th-century chieftain of Pashtun origin, who was killed in battle with Kandarpanarayan Rai, the erstwhile Raja of Chandradwip. Khan's grandfather Abdul Wahab Khan was a prominent Bengali politician who served as Pakistan's third official Speaker of the National Assembly.

Khan says that he grew up in a state of financial difficulty, recalling that his mother made $16,000 in 1993 (equivalent to $37,000 in 2026)—he knew this because he had to do her taxes to get financial aid.

== Education ==
Khan attended Grace King High School, where, as he recalls, "a few classmates were fresh out of jail and others were bound for top universities." He was a cartoonist for the high school's newspaper. Khan took mathematics courses at the University of New Orleans while he was in high school and graduated as valedictorian in 1994.

He attended the Massachusetts Institute of Technology (MIT), graduating in 1998 with a double major bachelor's degree in Electrical Engineering & Computer Science and Mathematics and a Master of Engineering degree, also in Electrical Engineering & Computer Science. In 2012, Khan returned to MIT to deliver a commencement speech. He was 35, making him his alma mater's youngest commencement speaker in at least 30 years.

Khan also holds a Master of Business Administration from Harvard Business School, graduating in 2003.

== Career ==
In 2002, Khan was a summer intern at Xerox PARC. From 2003 to late 2009, he worked as a hedge fund analyst at Connective Capital Management.

=== Khan Academy ===
In 2004, Khan started tutoring his cousin, Nadia, in mathematics over the internet using Yahoo!'s doodle notepad. When other relatives and friends sought his tutoring, he founded Khan Academy in 2006 and moved his tutorials to YouTube, where he created an account on November 16, 2006.

The popularity of his educational videos prompted Khan to quit his job as a financial analyst in 2009. He shifted his focus to developing his YouTube channel, Khan Academy, full-time with the aid of close friend Josh Gefner. In 2010, Khan's freshman-year roommate at MIT, Shantanu Sinhal, was appointed as Khan Academy’s president. Khan subsequently received sponsorship from Ann Doerr, the wife of John Doerr.

Khan outlined his mission: to "accelerate learning for students of all ages. With this in mind, we want to share our content with whoever may find it useful." Khan believes that supplementing traditional classroom education with the technology being developed by his Academy can improve the effectiveness of teachers by freeing them from traditional lectures and giving them more time for instruction specific to individual students' needs. In 2009, Khan planned to extend the "free school" to cover topics such as English literature.

Khan Academy, initially a tool for students, added the Coach feature in 2012, promoting the connection of teachers with students through videos and monitor tools. In 2015, Khan announced that Khan Academy was partnering with the College Board to create free practice resources for the SAT test.

Khan published a book about Khan Academy and education goals titled The One World Schoolhouse: Education Reimagined. In 2023, Khan Academy has more than 155 million registered users, with students spending billions of hours of learning on the platform.

Stanford AI researcher Andrew Ng has named Khan as an inspiration for the founding of Coursera, one of the first massive open online course (MOOC) platforms.

=== Khan Lab School ===
Khan's pedagogical idea is that students learn better when they can manage the process of acquiring knowledge independently and at their own pace. They should then work in teams to apply the knowledge they have learned. This concept is known as flipped classroom. His approach to learning incorporates elements of Benjamin Bloom's mastery learning. This learning method is tested at his Khan Lab School, founded in 2014.

=== Schoolhouse.world ===
In early 2020 during the COVID-19 pandemic, Khan launched Schoolhouse, a free non-profit initiative to provide small-group tutoring for students worldwide through Zoom meetings. Schoolhouse certifications, developed in partnership with the University of Chicago, test students’ mastery of subjects and certify their knowledge. MIT, Caltech, and Case Western Reserve University have since signed on.

=== TED ===
In October 2025, TED announced Khan would become its new "Vision Steward", succeeding Chris Anderson. Khan’s role involves advising on TED’s long-term direction in education and technology.

== Awards ==
In 2012, Khan received the American Academy of Achievement Golden Plate Award for public service. In 2014, Khan received the 19th Annual Heinz Award in the Human Condition category. In 2016, Khan received the Padma Shri, the fourth-highest civilian award of the Republic of India, from the President of India.

In 2021, Khan received an honorary Doctor of Laws degree from Harvard University and an honorary degree of Doctor of Humane Letters from Dartmouth College. On May 11, 2025, Khan received an honorary Doctor of Humane Letters degree from Carnegie Mellon University.

== Recognition ==
In 2010, the Bill and Melinda Gates Foundation became one of the academy's biggest supporters. Bill Gates has said: "I've used Khan Academy with my kids, and I'm amazed at the breadth of Sal's subject expertise and his ability to make complicated topics understandable."

In 2012, Khan was named one of Time's 100 most influential people in the world (Time 100). In the same year, he was featured on the cover of Forbes, with the tagline "The $1 Trillion Opportunity."

== Personal life ==
Khan is married to physician Umaima Marvi. The couple live with their children in Mountain View, California. Khan's first child, a son, suffered from childhood epilepsy, which he later outgrew, but the experience had lasting effects for the family to realize what was important in life.

Khan has said about his beliefs:

"If you believe in trying to make the best of the finite number of years we have on this planet (while not making it any worse for anyone else), think that pride and self-righteousness are the cause of most conflict and negativity, and are humbled by the vastness and mystery of the Universe, then I'm the same religion as you."

Khan played the guitar in his childhood.
