= Dhankundi =

Village in Rajshahi Division, Bangladesh

Coordinates: 24.5642°N 89.4793°E

Dhankundi is a village in Sherpur Upazila, Bogra District, Bangladesh. It was established about 1750. Dhankundi Shahnaj Siraj High School was founded in 1992; its grounds border the N5 Dhaka - Rangpur Highway.

== See also ==
- List of villages in Bangladesh
