= Bhabanipur Shakta pitha =

Bhabanipur Temple
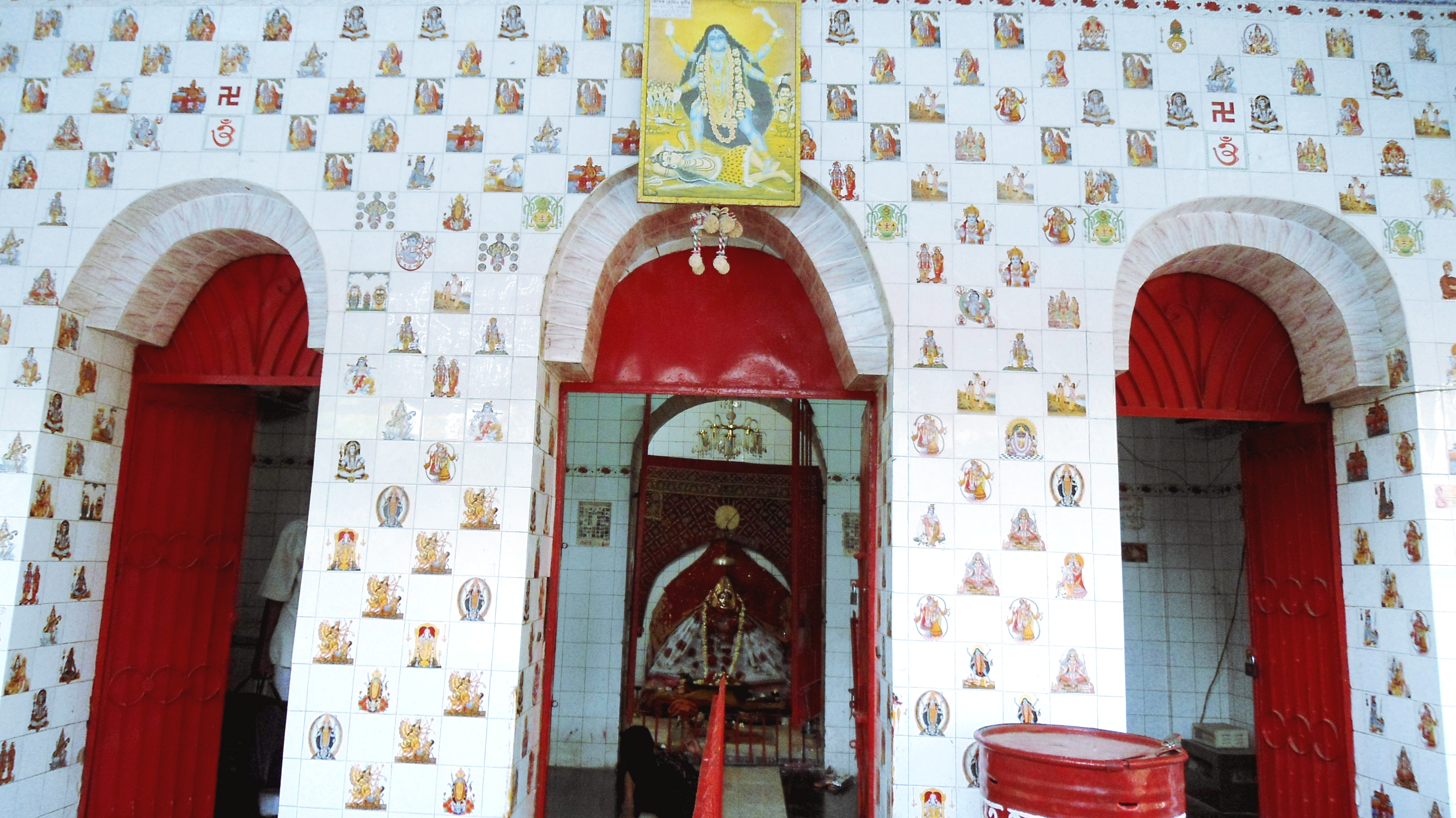

- Location within Bangladesh Rajshahi division Location within Bangladesh

Religion
- Affiliation: Hinduism
- Deity: Aparna

Location
- Location: Bhabanipur, Sherpur Upazila, Bogra
- Country: Bangladesh
- Interactive map of Bhabanipur Temple
- Coordinates: 24.557°N 89.434°E

Website
- bhabanipur.org/english

Bhabanipur (Bengali: ভবানীপুর) is a Hindu temple complex in northwestern Bangladesh located about 33 kilometres (21 mi) from Bogra. It is located in Sherpur Upazila of Bogra District, Rajshahi Division. It is one of the Shakta pithas of the Indian subcontinent.

== Significance ==
According to the Purana, in the Satya Yuga, King Daksha (Son of Lord Bramha) arranged a ritual called Yagya in which hisr daughter Goddess Sati and Her husband "Lord Shiva" was not invited. Still Goddess Sati attended the function. Unable to bear the insult towards Her husband Lord Shiva, Goddess Sati protested by sacrificing Herself into the fire of the Yagna. Enraged with grief, Lord Shiva started the dance of destruction across the Universe with the corpse of Goddess Sati on His shoulder. To stop this, Lord Vishnu cut the corpse of Goddess Sati with the Sudharshan Chakra and as a result the various pieces of Goddess Sati's body and Her ornaments fell at various places of the Indian subcontinent. These places are now known as Shakta pithas. Shakta pithas are holy abode of the Mother Goddess. Each temple has shrines for Shakti and Kalabhairava. The Shakti of Bhabanipur shrine is addressed as "Aparna" and the "Bhairava" as "Vaman". It is believed that Sati Devi's Left anklet fell here.

The Shakti devi here is called Aparna and the Bhairava is Vaman. The part of "Sati" Maa Tara's body fell at Bhabanipur could be left anklet (ornament), ribs of left chest, right eye, or bedding (according to various sources).

Being a Shakta pitha, Bhabanipur is a historic place of pilgrimage for the followers of Hinduism. There are numerous temples at this Shakta pitha premises which are visited by pilgrims from all over the country and abroad, irrespective of sectarian differences.

== Legend ==
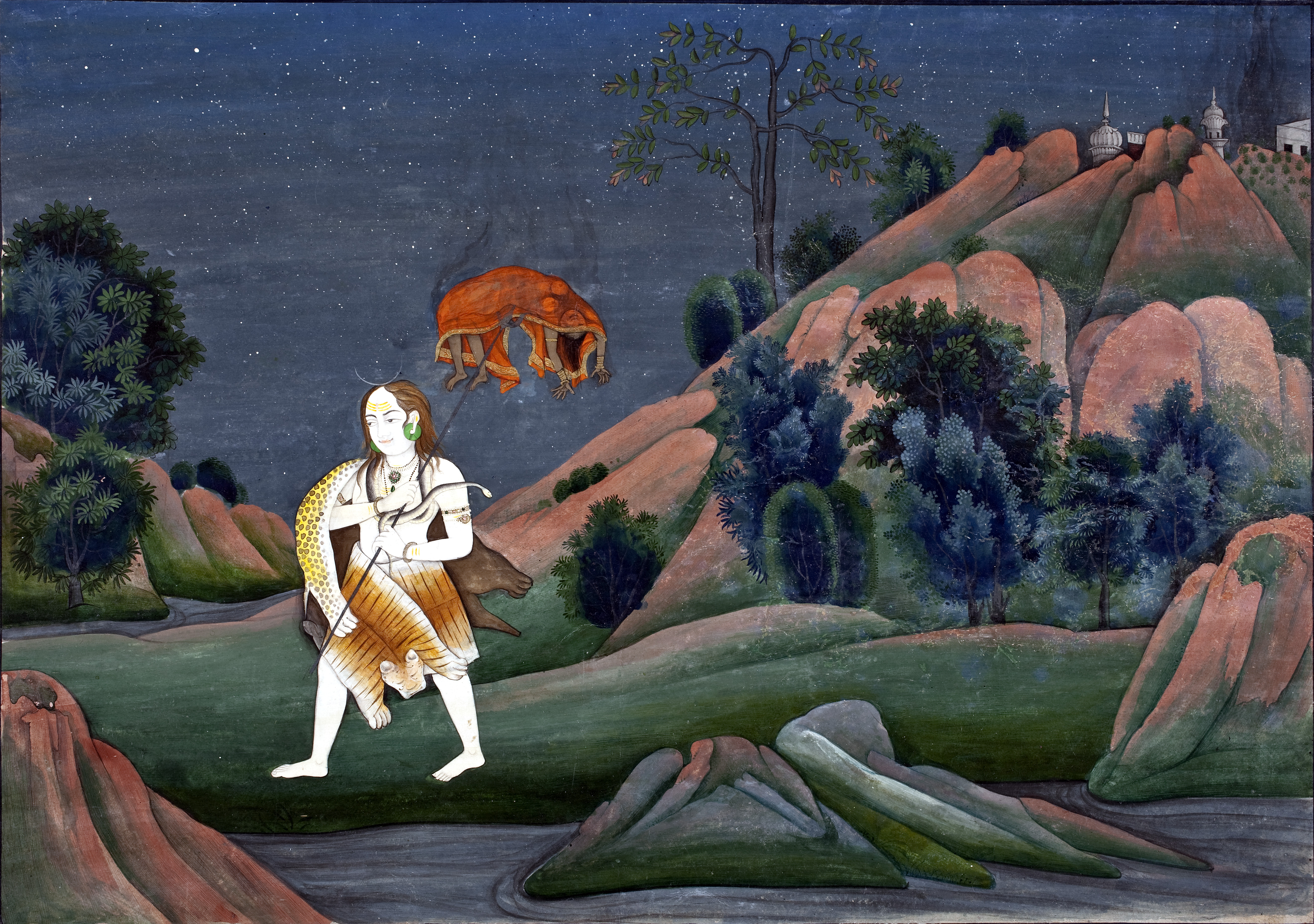
Shiva carrying the corpse of Sati Devi

There is a legend saying that while once a conch-bangles dealer was passing by the side of a lonely pond in a dense jungle near the then Bhabanipur temple, a little girl with a tip of vermilion on her forehead approached him and told him that she was the daughter of the Natore Rajbari (Palace). She bought a pair of conch-bangles from him and requested him to collect the price of that bangles from the then Maharani Bhabani from a basket kept in the Rajbari at a specified place. Her appearance and polite words overwhelmed the conch-dealer. The Maharani (Queen) rushed to the place/site with her men and the conch-dealer as soon as she heard this from him. On the earnest prayer by the conch-dealer, Ma Bhabani raised from that pond showing her two wrists with the conch-bangles worn. The Maharani and the men present there were surprised, and the divinity of Mother Bhabani spread throughout this subcontinent. This is that sacred "Shakha-Pukur" (conch-bangles pond) where the devotees take their holy bath when they go there.

== Temples ==
Surrounded by a boundary wall, the Temple comprises about an area of four acres (12 bighas) - Main Temple, Belbaran Tala, 4 Shiva Temples, Patal Bhairava Shiva Temple, Gopal Temple, Bashudev Temple and Nat Mandir. On the north side, there is a Sheba Angan, Holy Shakha-Pukur (conch-bangles pond), 2 bathing ghats, 4 Shiva Temples outside the boundary wall and a Panchamunda Asana.

== Worship, rituals and festivals ==
Pravati and Balya Bhog worship and Anna Bhog at noon, and Arati and Bhog at evening. Devotees can offer Bhog to the divine mother "Tara" (Ma Bhabani) every day and take Prasad later.

Every year, festivals take place at the Bhabanipur Temple premises on auspicious occasions. They are:

- Maghi Purnima in the Bengali month of Magh/Falgun
- Ram Nabomi in the month of Chaitra/Baishakh
- Durgotshov in autumn
- Dipannita Shyama Puja
- Nabanna in the month of Aghrahoyon

== Communication ==
Devotees can go to Bhabanipur from Dhaka via Jamuna Bridge and after passing Chandaikona in Sirajganj District, they can reach Ghoga Bot-tola bus stoppage on the same highway from where they can reach the Bhabanipur Temple premises by availing themselves of van or scooter. Pilgrims from the districts located to the North of Bogra can reach the Bhabanipur Temple premises by passing through Sherpur, Mirzapur and Ghoga Bot-tola (bus stoppage) of Bogra district.

== Temple management ==
The Bhabanipur Temple Renovation, Development and Management Committee had been successfully supervising the temple activities and Ma Bhabani's properties from 1991 up until 2010. On 13 February 2007, Combined Forces of that time (Special law enforcement forces) destroyed the Guest House which was under construction by the committee for the devotees.
