= Babhani, Uttar Pradesh =

Babhani is a village in Uttar Pradesh, India.
