= Rampur Bhawanipur =

- Census town
- Location in Uttar Pradesh, India
- Coordinates: 26°21′53″N 84°09′46″E
- Country: India
- State: Uttar Pradesh
- District: Barabanki

Population (2001)
  - Total: 11,303

Languages
  - Official: Hindi
- Time zone: UTC+5:30 (IST)

Rampur Bhawanipur is a census town in Barabanki district in the Indian state of Uttar Pradesh.

== Demographics ==
As of 2001 India census, Rampur Bhawanipur had a population of 11,303. Males constitute 52% of the population and females 48%. Rampur Bhawanipur has an average literacy rate of 36%, lower than the national average of 59.5%: male literacy is 43%, and female literacy is 28%. In Rampur Bhawanipur, 19% of the population is under 6 years of age.
