= Bhabanipur, Purba Medinipur =

Bhabanipur
- Village
- Location in West Bengal, India Bhabanipur (India)
- Coordinates: 22.182306°N 87.896552°E
- Country: India
- State: West Bengal
- District: Purba Medinipur

Population (2011)
  - Total: 3,954

Languages
  - Official: Bengali, English
- Time zone: UTC+5:30 (IST)
- PIN: 721632
- Telephone/STD code: 03228
- Lok Sabha constituency: Tamluk
- Vidhan Sabha constituency: Haldia
- Website: purbamedinipur.gov.in

Bhabanipur is a village in Haldia CD block in Haldia subdivision of Purba Medinipur district in the state of West Bengal, India.

== Geography ==
Cities and towns in Tamluk subdivision of Purba Medinipur district
M: municipal city/ town, CT: census town, R: rural/ urban centre, H: historical/ religious centre
Owing to space constraints in the small map, the actual locations in a larger map may vary slightly

=== Location ===
Bhabanipur is located at 22.182306°N 87.896552°E.

=== Urbanisation ===
94.08% of the population of Tamluk subdivision live in the rural areas. Only 5.92% of the population live in the urban areas, and that is the second lowest proportion of urban population amongst the four subdivisions in Purba Medinipur district, just above Egra subdivision.

Note: The map alongside presents some of the notable locations in the subdivision. All places marked in the map are linked in the larger full screen map.

== Demographics ==
As per 2011 Census of India Bhabanipur had a total population of 3,954 of which 2,064 (52%) were males and 1,890 (48%) were females. Population below 6 years was 278. The total number of literates in Bhabanipur was 3,131 (88.15% of the population over 6 years).

== Transport ==
Bhabanipur is on National Highway 116B. Nandakumar railway station is located nearby.

== Education ==
Maharaja Nandakumar Mahavidyalaya was established at Bhabanipur in 2007. It is affiliated with Vidyasagar University. It offers honours courses in Bengali, English, Sanskrit, history, geography and education, and general courses in arts and science.
