= Babhani, Nepal =

Coordinates: 27°04′N 85°10′E

Babhani बभानी
- Village development committee
- Interactive map of Babhani
- Country: Nepal
- Province: Lumbini Province
- District: Rupandehi District

Population (1991)
  - Total: 4,236
- Time zone: UTC+5:45 (Nepal Time)

Babhani is a village development committee in Rupandehi District in Lumbini Province of southern Nepal. At the time of the 1991 Nepal census it had a population of 4236 people living in 643 individual households.
