= Khan Academy =

Nonprofit educational organization

- Website type: 501(c)(3)
- Available in: Multiple languages
- Owners: Khan Academy, Inc.
- Founder: Sal Khan
- Website: KhanAcademy.org
- Launched: 2008; 18 years ago

YouTube information
- Channel: Khan Academy
- Years active: 2008–present
- Genre: Education
- Subscribers: 9.49 million
- Views: 2,251,686,402
- Last updated: October 16, 2026

Khan Academy is an American educational nonprofit organization founded in 2008 by Sal Khan. The organization provides free online learning resources for students and teachers worldwide.

The Khan Academy platform offers instructional videos, practice exercises, teaching tools, test preparation and assessment tests, across a range of subjects including mathematics, sciences, history, literature, economics and computer science. Lessons are typically delivered through short instructional videos paired with interactive practice activities.

Khan Academy is supported primarily through philanthropic donations, allowing its educational materials to remain freely available to users.

== History ==
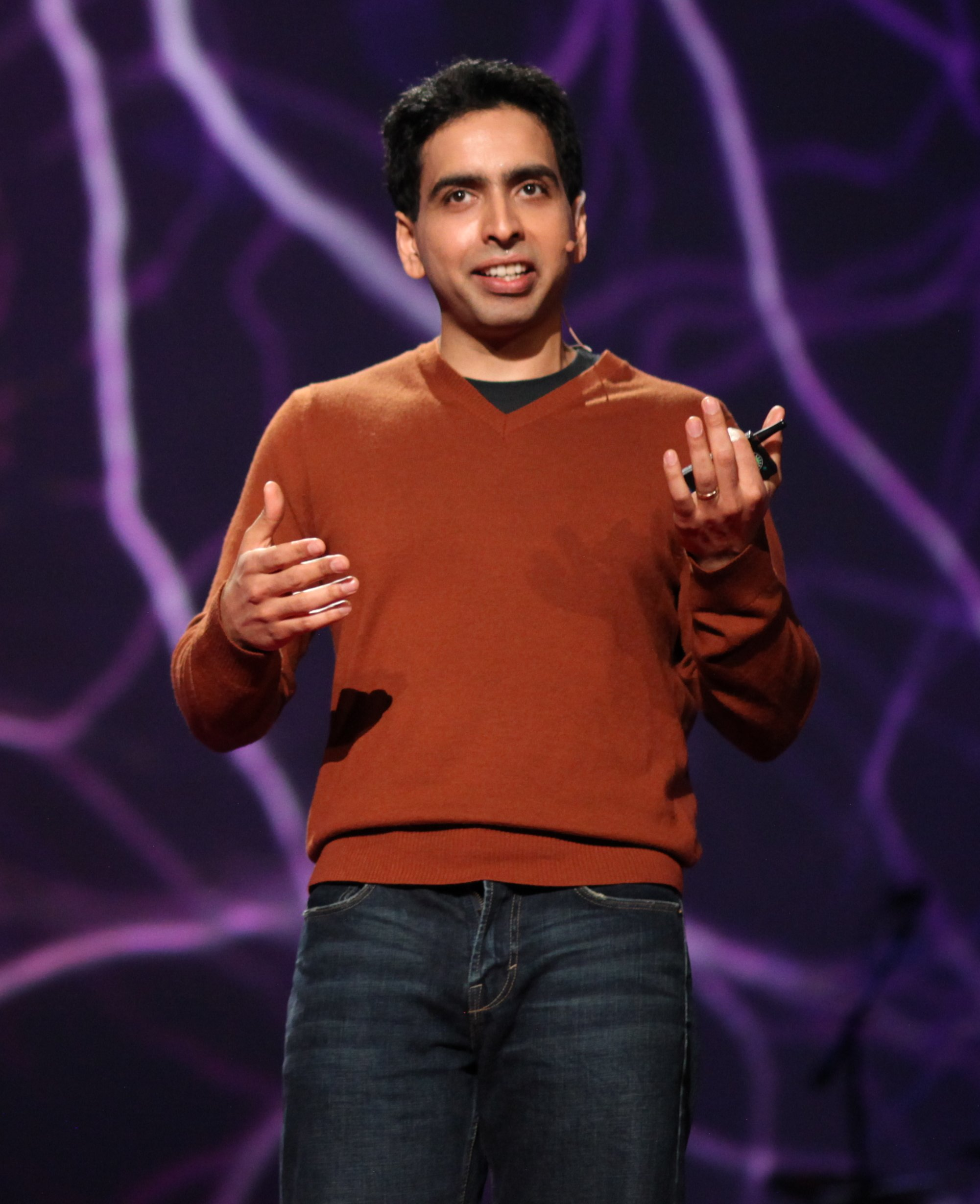
Sal Khan presenting during TED 2011

The origins of Khan Academy date to 2004, when Salman "Sal" Khan began tutoring a cousin in mathematics online using a service called Yahoo! Doodle Images. As additional relatives began using the lessons, Khan started recording instructional videos and publishing them on YouTube to make the material more widely accessible. Early tutorials were recorded on Khan's personal computer using drawing applications such as SmoothDraw and ArtRage, often with the aid of a Wacom tablet.

Public response, including coverage in USA Today, led Khan to incorporate Khan Academy as a nonprofit organization in 2008 and leave his job in finance to work on the project full time. The organization was established with the goal of providing free learning resources to students worldwide.

Khan Academy's lessons are primarily delivered through short instructional videos paired with interactive practice exercises and assessments. Studies have found that use of Khan Academy resources is associated with improved student academic performance.

In 2014, Khan Lab School, a laboratory school associated with Khan Academy and founded by Sal Khan, opened in Mountain View, California.

May-Li Khoe served as Vice President of Design at Khan Academy from 2014 to 2019, and contributed to the development of the platform's user experience and design strategy.

In January 2026, Khan Academy and Google shared their long-running partnership on AI-supported learning at Bett UK 2026. The pair created tools designed to support classroom instruction, rather than automate it, and to increase transparency in student learning and progress. The following month, Khan Academy expanded their collaboration with Google to integrate its Gemini AI model into literacy tools.

Khan Academy's board of directors includes executives from several technology, finance, and investment firms, including Reed Hastings, co-founder of Netflix; John Doerr, chairman of Kleiner Perkins; Ted Mitchell, President of the American Council on Education; Sanjiv Yajnik, president of Financial Services at Capital One; and Sal Khan, the organization's founder and Chief Executive Officer.

== Funding ==
Khan Academy is a 501(c)(3) non-profit organization, mostly funded by donations from philanthropic organizations. On its IRS form 990, the organization reported $31 million in revenues in 2018 and $28 million in 2019, including $839,000 in 2019 compensation for Khan as CEO.

In 2010, Google donated $2 million for creating new courses and translating content into other languages, as part of their Project 10^{100} program. In 2013, Carlos Slim from the Luis Alcazar Foundation in Mexico, made a donation for creating Spanish versions of videos. In 2015, AT&T contributed $2.25 million to Khan Academy for mobile versions of the content accessible through apps. The Bill & Melinda Gates Foundation, now called The Gates Foundation, has donated more than $10 million to Khan Academy. On January 11, 2021, Elon Musk donated $5 million through his Musk Foundation.

== Content ==
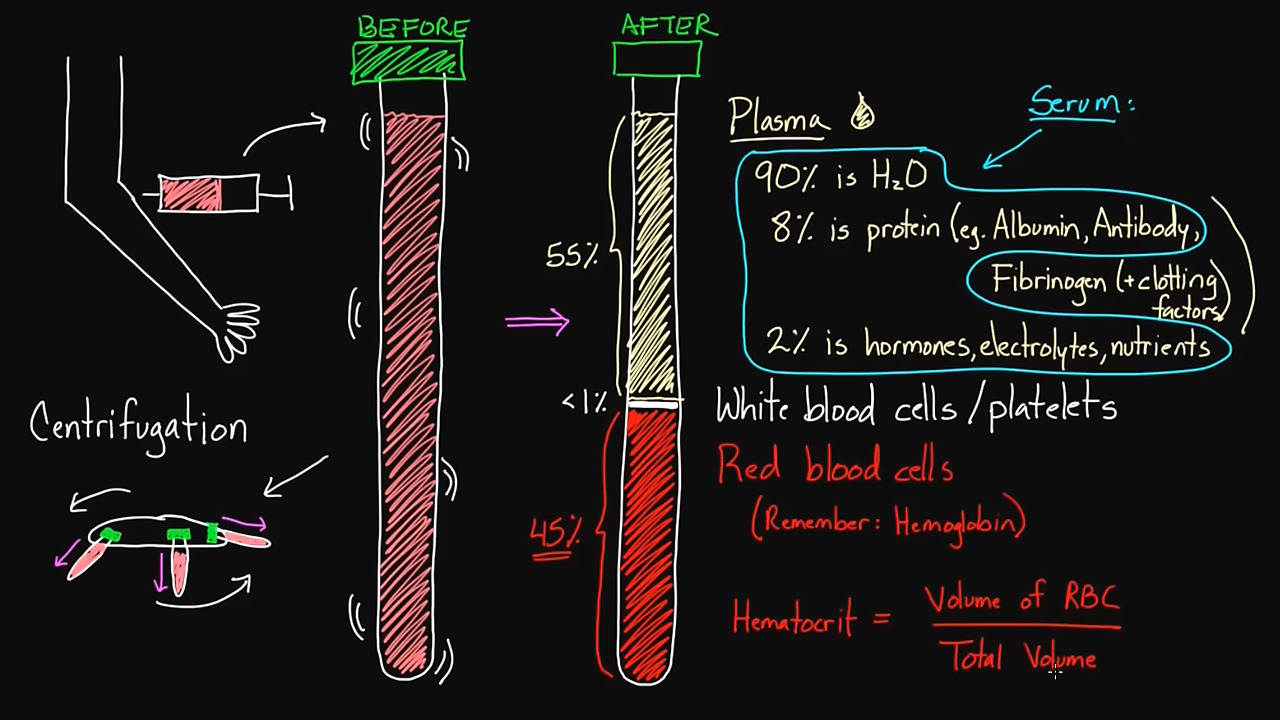
The narrator writes to an electronic blackboard during a recorded lecture.

Khan Academy offers classes with educational videos hosted on YouTube. The website is meant to be used as a supplement to the videos, because it includes other features such as progress tracking, practice exercises, and teaching tools. The material can also be accessed through mobile applications. The videos enable students to acquire knowledge at their own learning speed according to the concept of mastery learning. They can be used by teachers to teach according to the principle of the Flipped Classroom.

The videos display a recording of drawings on an electronic blackboard, which are similar to the style of a teacher giving a lecture. The narrator describes each drawing and how the drawings relate to the material being taught. Furthermore, throughout the lessons, users can earn badges and energy points, which can be displayed on their profiles. Non-profit groups have distributed offline versions of the videos to rural areas in Asia, Latin America, and Africa. Videos range from all subjects covered in school and for all grades from kindergarten up through high school. The Khan Academy website also hosts content from educational YouTube channels and organizations such as Crash Course and the Museum of Modern Art. It also provides online courses for preparing for standardized tests, including the SAT, AP Chemistry, Praxis Core and MCAT and released LSAT preparation lessons in 2018. It also has a collaboration with independent chemists, which are mentioned in "Meet the chemistry professional". Khan Academy has also supported Code.org's Hour of Code, providing coding lessons on its website.

In July 2017, Khan Academy became the official practice partner for the College Board's Advanced Placement.

=== Khanmigo ===
Khanmigo is a chatbot designed to assist users with mathematics, science, humanities, and coding inquiries, as well as aiding in learning these subjects. Khan Academy introduced Khanmigo on March 14, 2023. It was initially based on GPT-4, a large language model by OpenAI. Users can have access for $4 per month. Users who want to register must be over 18. The pilot provided access to approximately 65,000 students across 53 school districts. In November 2023, Khanmingo Writing Coach was introduced to provide essay-writing support for students and analytical insights for teachers. In August 2024, Khanmigo for Teachers, a set of free generative AI tools for educators, was announced in partnership with Microsoft. In December 2024, Khanmigo was featured on an episode of 60 Minutes with host Anderson Cooper, who tried the Writing Coach on one of his essays from middle school.

=== Language availability ===
Khan Academy videos have been translated into several languages, with nearly 20,000 subtitle translations available. These translations are mainly volunteer-driven with help from international partnerships. The Khan Academy platform is fully available in English (en), Bangla (bn), Hindi, Bulgarian (bg), Chinese (zh), French (fr), German (de), Georgian (ka), Norwegian (nb), Polish (pl) Portuguese (pt), Spanish (es), Serbian (sr), Turkish (tr) and Uzbek (uz), and partially available in 28 other languages.

=== Official SAT preparation ===
Since 2015, Khan Academy has been one of the official SAT preparation websites. According to reports, studying for the SAT for at least 20 hours at Khan Academy is associated with a 115-point average score increase.

=== Pixar in a Box ===
In 2015, Khan Academy teamed up with Pixar to create a new course named Pixar in a Box, which teaches how skills learned in school help the creators at Pixar.

=== Official Test Preparation ===
Khan Academy also provides free test preps for PSAT/NMSQT, LSAT, Praxis Core, and MCAT.

=== Khan Academy Kids ===
In 2018, Khan Academy launched an application called Khan Academy Kids for children aged two to seven to learn basic maths, reading and social skills.

=== Teachers ===
Teachers can set up a classroom within Khan Academy. This classroom allows teachers to assign courses within Khan Academy's database to their students. Teachers can also track their student's progress as they work through the assigned tutorials.

== Criticism ==
Khan Academy has been criticized because its creator, Sal Khan, lacks a formal teaching background. Statements made in certain mathematics and physics videos have been questioned for their technical accuracy. In response to these criticisms, the organization has corrected errors in its videos, expanded its faculty, and formed a network of over 200 content experts.

In an interview from January 2016, Khan defended the value of Khan Academy online lectures while acknowledging their limitations: "I think they're valuable, but I'd never say they somehow constitute a complete education." Khan Academy positions itself as a supplement to in-class learning, with the ability to improve the effectiveness of teachers by freeing them from traditional lectures and giving them more time to tend to individual students' needs.

In February 2024, a Wall Street Journal reporter tested the math tutoring capabilities of Khan Academy's AI chatbot Khanmigo and found that it made basic calculation errors.

== Recognition ==
- In 2012, Khan Academy won a Webby Award in the category Websites and Mobile Sites, Education.
- In 2016, Khan Academy won a Shorty Award for Best in Education.

== See also ==
- FutureLearn
- Pluralsight
- EdX
- Coursera
- Udemy
- Udacity
- LinkedIn Learning
