= Laborschule Bielefeld =

Coordinates: 52.0364°N 8.49833°E

Laboratory School Bielefeld
- German: Laborschule Bielefeld
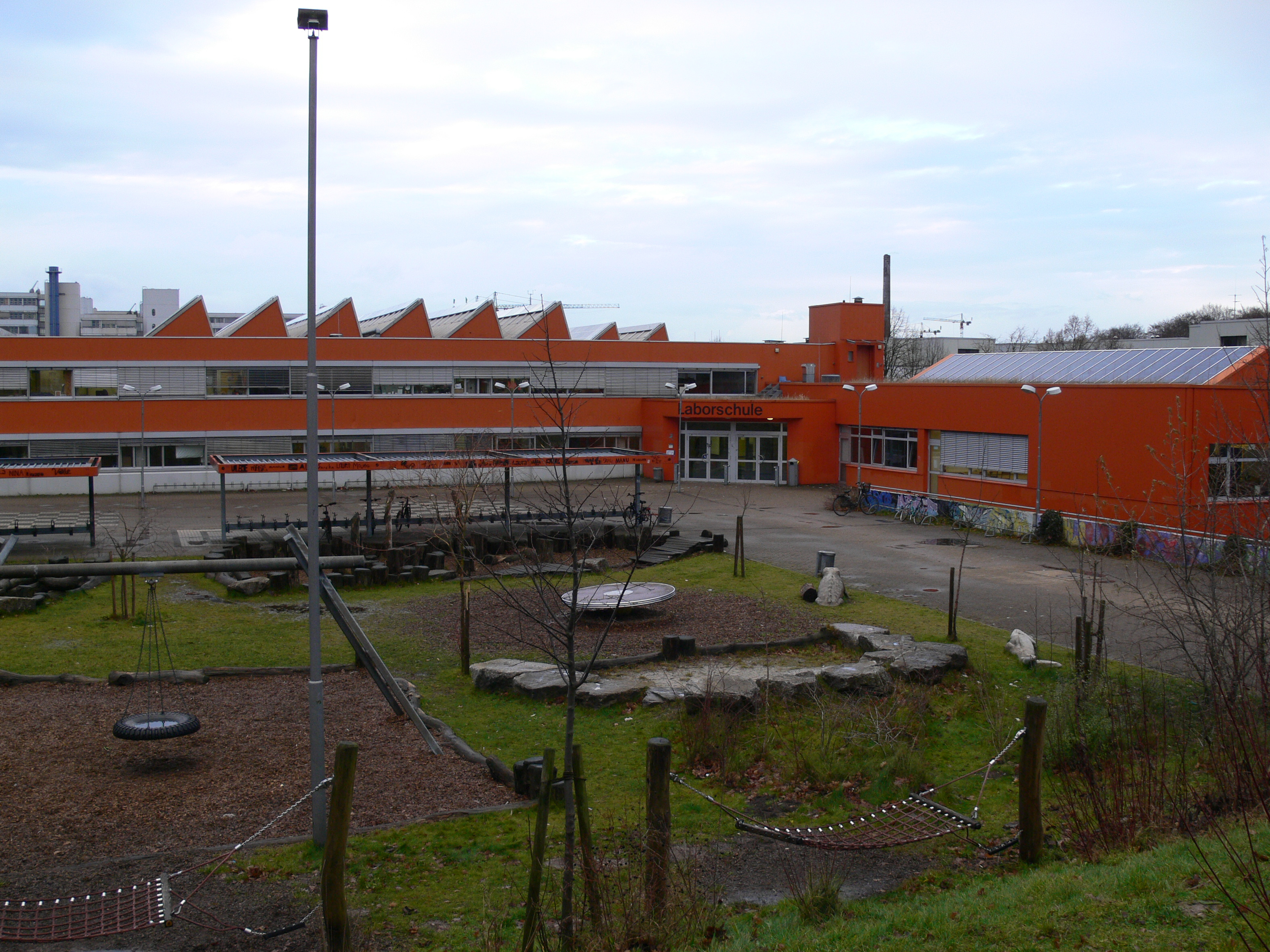

Information
- Established: 1974; 52 years ago
- Grades: Preschool - Grade 10
- Enrollment: 660

The Laborschule Bielefeld ("Laboratory School Bielefeld") is an alternative school located in the city of Bielefeld, Germany. It has received significant media coverage in Germany because it is one of Germany's few "democratic" schools. The Laborschule has been called one of Germany's best schools by the media. One of the German teachers' unions has objected to this.

== History ==
The school was founded in 1974. It is a democratic school that was founded in the belief that the school should be made to fit the child, rather than the other way around. The school is based on the ideas of Hartmut von Hentig.

== Student body ==
The school starts in 0th grade (preschool) and ends with 10th grade. It serves 660 students and enrolls 60 new students every year. When the school was founded it was supposed to be a "school for the proletariat" ("Proletarierschule") and a "school for everybody". The school tried to persuade working-class parents to enroll their children, but they were not successful. In 2005 only 1.6% of the pupils had a father who was an unskilled worker and only 3.2% had a father who was a skilled worker. The majority of the children who attend the school have parents who are college graduates. The Laborschule attempted to explain this by claiming that the school was located near Bielefeld University and thus there were not many working-class children living nearby. It also stated that democratic schools appeal to middle-class parents.

== Quotas ==
The school always wanted to "model Germany" and "model the City of Bielefeld" and admit as many children from working class and immigrant families as possible. While that goal was not reached the school made efforts to reach it. It has run campaigns to encourage students from those backgrounds to apply for enrollment. In 2009 a representative of the school stated that working-class and minority students will be guaranteed a slot, while slots for non-minority middle-class students are allocated by lottery, because there are more students applying for the school than slots.

== Grading at the Laborschule Bielefeld ==
Only students in grades nine and ten get written marks for their work. Students in the earlier grades receive yearly written letters about the progress they made in class. The letters are discussed with both the student and his or her parents.

=== Function of the evaluation letters ===
Evaluation letters serve several purposes:

- documenting what the student learned that year
- informing the parents
- praising the student for his achievements
- communicating with the student

== Performance at the Programme for International Student Assessment ==
The students of the Laborschule participated in the Programme for International Student Assessment. They did well and the media was quick to announce the Laborschule one of Germany's best schools. Later it was revealed that most of the schools students came from privileged families and that in reading and natural sciences they did just as well as children from similar backgrounds. It was also revealed that the Laborschule students did not do as well as other students from similar backgrounds in math. Later it was also shown that working-class children attending the Laborschule did not do as well as their middle-class peers. A study showed that parents of the children attending the school were very pleased with its performance overall. It was also shown that the schools students knew much about politics, were responsible, and were willing to integrate people from other countries.
