= Bhawanipur, Kapurthala =

Bhawanipur
- Village
- Location in Punjab, India Bhawanipur (India)
- Coordinates: 31.263893°N 76.273617°E
- Country: India
- State: Punjab
- District: Kapurthala

Government
  - Type: Panchayati raj (India)
  - Body: Gram panchayat

Population (2011)
  - Total: 2,472
- Sex ratio 1317/1155♂/♀

Languages
  - Official: Punjabi
  - Other spoken: Hindi
- Time zone: UTC+5:30 (IST)
- PIN: 144601
- Telephone code: 01822
- ISO 3166 code: IN-PB
- Vehicle registration: PB-09
- Website: kapurthala.gov.in

Bhawanipur is a village in Kapurthala district of Punjab State, India. It is located 4 kilometres (2.5 mi) from Kapurthala, which is both district and sub-district headquarters of Bhawanipur. The village is administrated by a Sarpanch who is an elected representative.

== Demography ==
According to the 2011 Census of India, Bhawanipur had 487 houses and a population of 2,472, comprising 1,317 males and 1,155 females. The Literacy rate was 75.52%, lower than state average of 75.84%. The population of children under the age of 6 years was 266 and the child sex ratio was approximately 750, lower than state average of 846.

== Air travel connectivity ==
The closest airport to the village is Sri Guru Ram Dass Jee International Airport.
