= Bhawanipur, East Champaran =

Bhawanipur
- village
- Location in Bihar, India Bhawanipur (India)
- Coordinates: 26°26′10″N 84°44′8″E
- Country: India
- State: Bihar
- District: East Champaran

Population (2011)
  - Total: 16,549

Languages
  - Official: Maithili, Hindi, Bhojpuri
- Time zone: UTC+5:30 (IST)
- PIN: 845434
- ISO 3166 code: IN-BR
- Vehicle registration: BR-
- Coastline: 0 kilometres (0 mi)
- Nearest city: Motihari
- Sex ratio: 50:48 ♂/♀
- Literacy: 67%
- Lok Sabha constituency: Motihari

Bhawanipur is near Areraj in the Indian state of Bihar. Bhawanipur is situated at the Bank of River Budhi-Gandak which falls in Ganga Patna. Bhawanipur is situated at a distance of about 40 km from Motihari, the district headquarters of East Champaran district. The National Highway NH 28 provides the closest route to Motihari. Bhawanipur falls under the jurisdiction of Sangrampur Police Station. Bhawani Pur village has two Panchayats: South Bhawani Pur and North Bhawani Pur. The famous Someshwar Shiv Madir, is located at Areraj which is at a 15-minute drive from Bhawanipur. Bhawani Pur belongs to the Kesaria Assembly and the Purvi Champaran (Lok Sabha constituency) Lok Sabha of Bihar.

== Climate ==
Climate is characterised by high temperatures and evenly distributed precipitation throughout the year. The Köppen Climate Classification sub-type for this climate is "Cfa" (Humid Subtropical Climate).

In 2020, Bhawanipur was among the areas which was affected by flood due to breakdown of the dam.

Climate data for Bhawanipur
Month	Jan	Feb	Mar	Apr	May	Jun	Jul	Aug	Sep	Oct	Nov	Dec	Year
Mean daily maximum °C (°F)	24.1 (75.4)	26.6 (79.9)	32.2 (90.0)	36.3 (97.3)	35.9 (96.6)	33.8 (92.8)	32.1 (89.8)	31.9 (89.4)	32.1 (89.8)	31.5 (88.7)	28.8 (83.8)	25.4 (77.7)	30.9 (87.6)
Mean daily minimum °C (°F)	9.1 (48.4)	11.4 (52.5)	15.9 (60.6)	21.1 (70.0)	24.3 (75.7)	25.7 (78.3)	26 (79)	26 (79)	25.5 (77.9)	21.8 (71.2)	14.6 (58.3)	10 (50)	19.3 (66.7)
Average precipitation mm (inches)	16 (0.6)	4 (0.2)	10 (0.4)	26 (1.0)	57 (2.2)	195 (7.7)	320 (12.6)	314 (12.4)	226 (8.9)	92 (3.6)	8 (0.3)	1 (0.0)	1,269 (49.9)
Source: climate-data
