= Bhawan Bahadur Nagar =

Bhawan Bahadur Nagar B.B. Nagar
- Town
- Nickname: Bhaun
- Location in Uttar Pradesh, India
- Coordinates: 28°39′15″N 77°57′22″E
- Country: India
- State: Uttar Pradesh
- District: Bulandshahr

Population (2011)
  - Total: 10,188

Languages
  - Official: Hindi
- Time zone: UTC+5:30 (IST)
- PIN: 203402
- Vehicle registration: UP 13

Bhawan Bahadur Nagar (B. B. Nagar) is a town and a Nagar panchayat in Bulandshahr district in the state of Uttar Pradesh, India. It is also a part of the National Capital Region of Delhi. This town is near to Hapur District.

As of 2011 census of India, Bhawan Bahadur Nagar had a population of 10,188. Males constitute 53% of the population and females 47%. Bhawan Bahadur Nagar has an average literacy rate of 60%, compared to the national average of 59.5%; with male literacy of 72% and female literacy of 46%. 15% of its population is under 6 years of age. BB Nagar stands for Bhawan Bahadur Nagar.

Siyana is the tehsil of BB Nagar. BB Nagar is a Block of Bulandshahr district. The town has a park and two public colleges: Swatantra Bharat Inter college (SB inter college) for men, and Government Girls Inter college for women. Another college is co-ed.

There town has two hospitals and a veterinary hospital. A sweet named "Bajre ki baal" is associated with the town.
