= Rural Development Academy =

Institution in Bangladesh

পল্লী উন্নয়ন একাডেমী Rural Development Academy
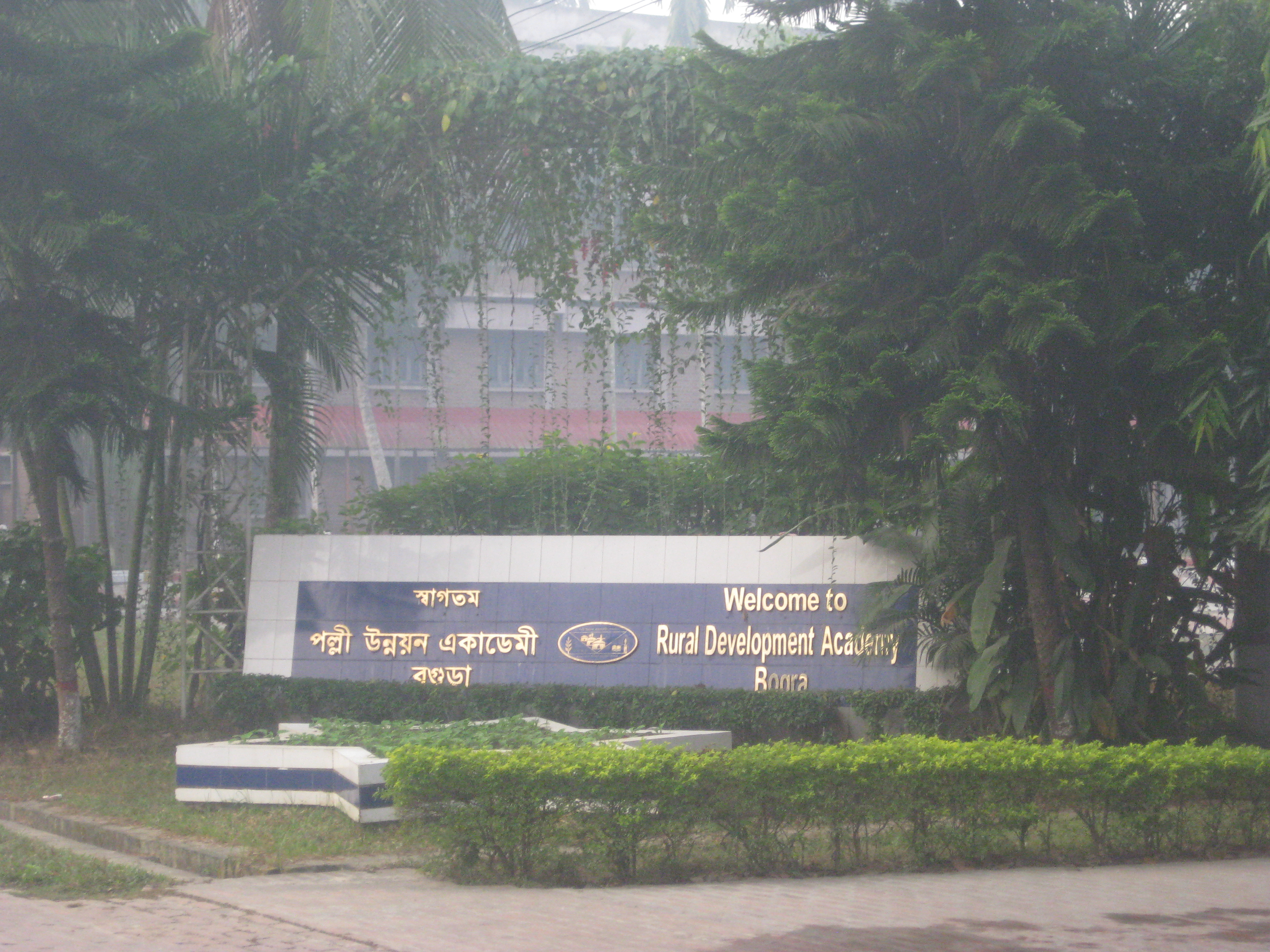
- Welcome plate of RDA
- Type: Rural development academy
- Founded: 1974
- Headquarters: Bogra, Bangladesh
- Website: www.rda.gov.bd

The Rural Development Academy (RDA) (Bengali: পল্লী উন্নয়ন একাডেমী) is a specialized rural development institution in Sherpur Upazila of Bogra District, Bangladesh for training, research and action research. It was established on 19 June 1974.

The total area of the Rural Development Academy is about 48.50 hectares, which includes offices, residences, a school and college, a playground, a children's park, and other establishments; about 29.50 hectares has been earmarked for a demonstration farm for undertaking research in farming, horticulture, floriculture, tissue culture, pisciculture, livestock, poultry, and other fields.

The Rural Development Academy is an autonomous body. This institution is officiated with the Rural Development and Co-operatives Division of the Ministry of Local Government, Rural Development & Co-operatives (LGRDC).

== Location ==
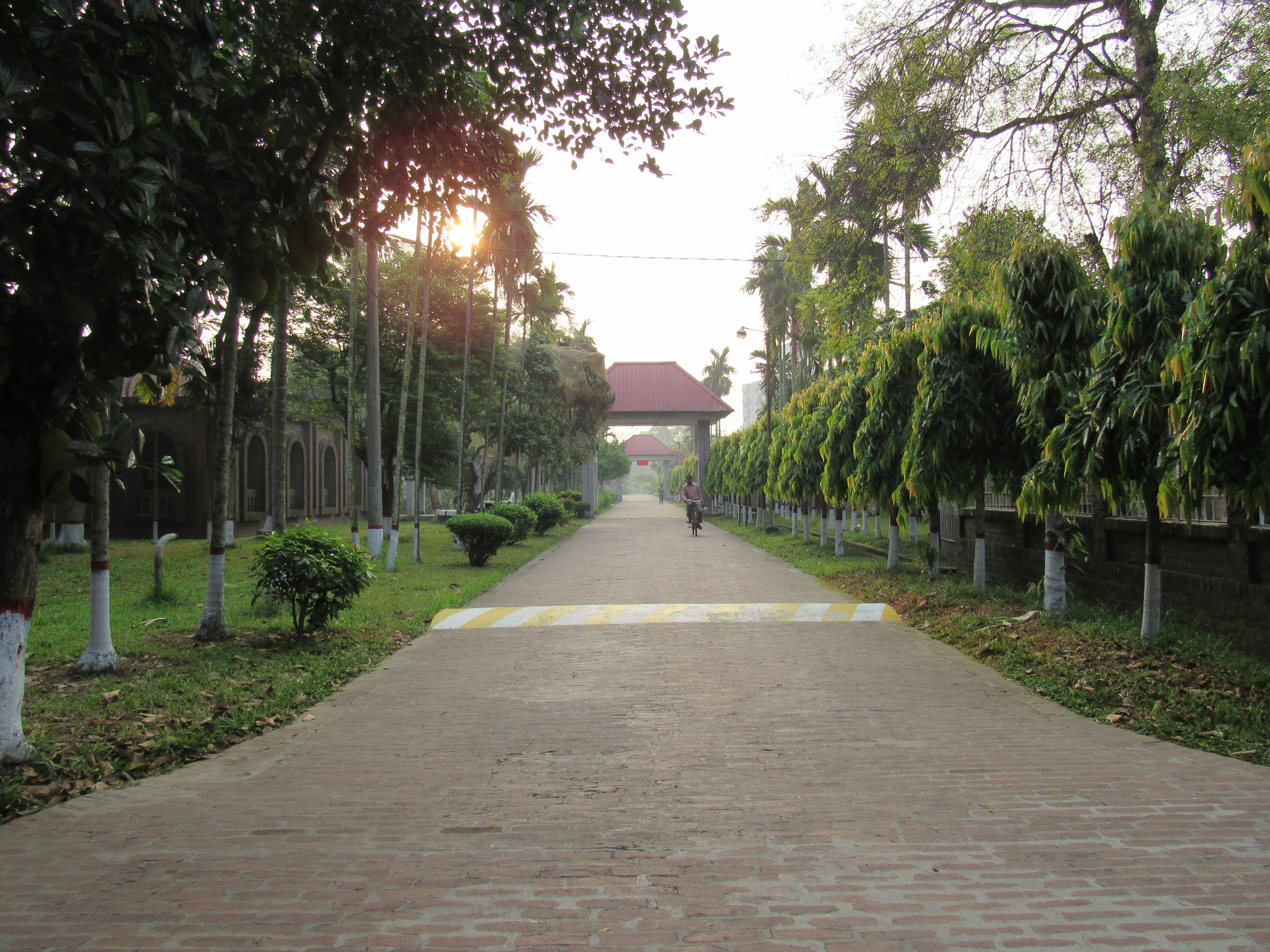
Walkway in Rural Development Academy with decorated trees in morning

The Academy is located at Sherpur, 16 km from Bogra town. The campus is spread over a vast area that also hosts residences, conference rooms, mosque, library, a health clinic, sports complex, and other amenities. The campus has the modern facilities of urban life.

== Objectives ==
One of the main functions of RDA is to provide training for both officials and non-official members of the public and private institutions. It is also known for undertaking quality research on different fields. Rural development academy is multi-disciplinary in nature. The faculty of the Academy consists of multiple academic disciplines. The Academy has a strength of 304 personnel including 61 Faculty Members.

=== Research ===
The Academy is mainly undertaking research on farming, horticulture, floriculture, tissue culture, pisciculture, livestock, Poultry etc.
