= Bhawanipur (community development block) =

Bhawanipur Community Development Block भवानीपुर सामुदायिक विकास खंड
- Community development block
- Location in Bihar, India Bhawanipur Community Development Block (India)
- Coordinates: 25°39′00″N 87°08′23″E
- Country: India
- State: Bihar
- Region: Mithila
- District: Purnia

Population (2001)
  - Total: 126,742

Languages
  - Official: Maithili, Hindi
- Time zone: UTC+5:30 (IST)
- Lok Sabha constituency: Purnia
- Vidhan Sabha constituency: Rupauli
- Website: purnia.nic.in

Bhawanipur (community development block) is one of the administrative divisions of Purnia district in the Indian state of Bihar.

== Geography ==
Bhawanipur is located at 25°39′00″N 87°08′23″E

=== Panchayats ===
Panchayats in Bhawanipur community development block are: Barhari, Basantpur Chintaman, Bhawanipur East, Bhawanipur West, Gondwara Patkaili, Jawe, Lathi, Raghunathpur, Sahidganj, Sonama, Sondip Milik, Sripur Milik, Supouli and Suraiti.

== Demographics ==
As per 2001 census, Bhawanipur block had a population of 126,742.
