= Raipur, Sareni =

RaeRae Rāipur
- Village
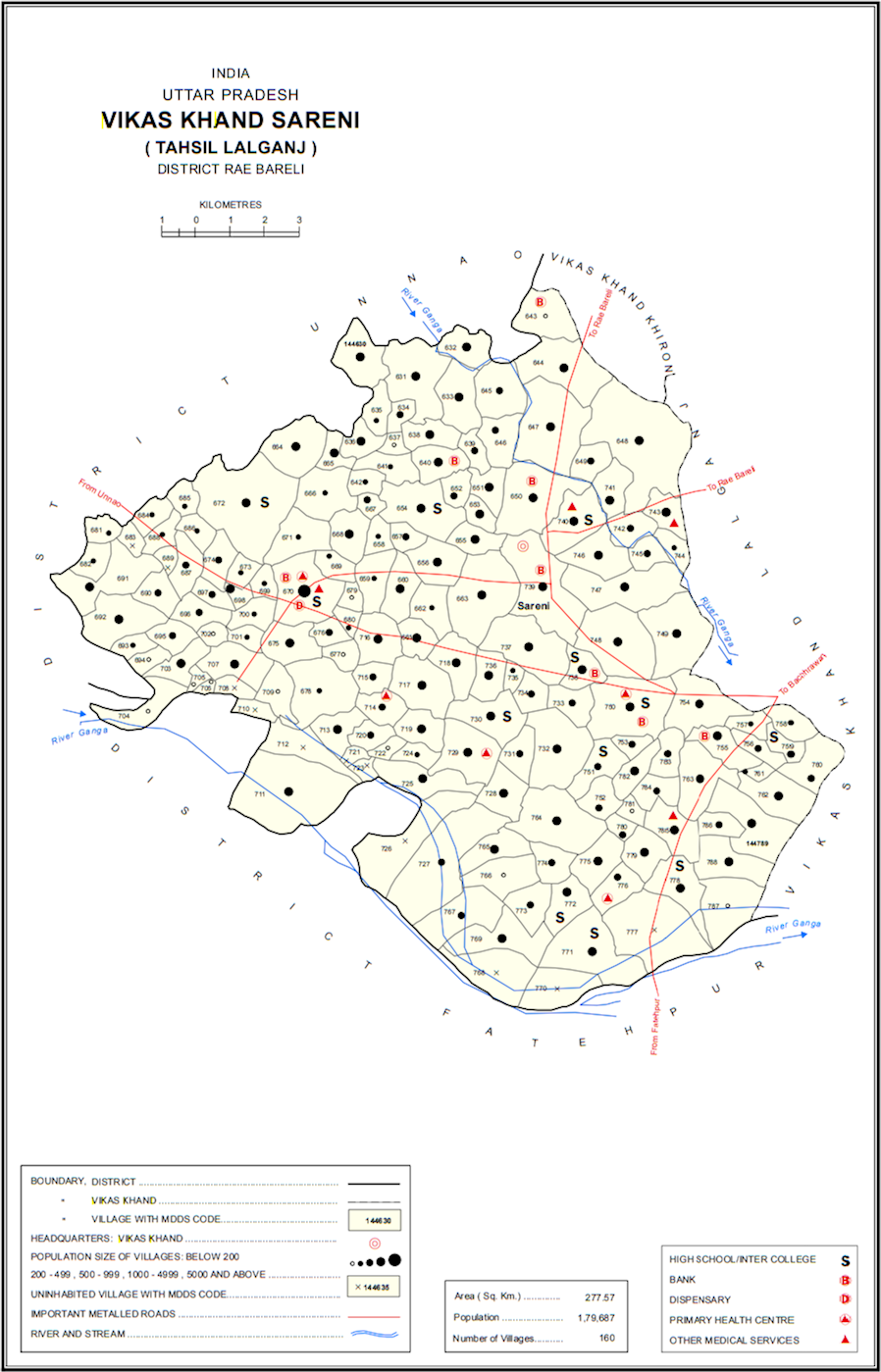
- Map showing Raipur (#730) in Sareni CD block

- Location in Uttar Pradesh, India
- Coordinates: 26.110897°N 80.810637°E
- Country: India
- State: Uttar Pradesh
- District: Raebareli

Area
  - Total: 2.044 km^{2} (0.789 sq mi)

Population (2011)
  - Total: 1,672
  - Density: 818.0/km^{2} (2,119/sq mi)

Languages
  - Official: Hindi
- Time zone: UTC+5:30 (IST)
- Vehicle registration: UP-35

Raipur is a village in Sareni block of Rae Bareli district, Uttar Pradesh, India. It is located 21 km from Lalganj, the tehsil headquarters. As of 2011, it has a population of 1,672 people, in 408 households. It serves as the headquarters of a nyaya panchayat which also includes 11 other villages.

The 1951 census recorded Raipur as comprising 2 hamlets, with a total population of 641 people (319 male and 322 female), in 137 households and 107 physical houses. The area of the village was given as 512 acres. 76 residents were literate, 75 male and 1 female. The village was listed as belonging to the pargana of Sareni and the thana of Sareni.

The 1961 census recorded Raipur as comprising 4 hamlets, with a total population of 868 people (408 male and 460 female), in 142 households and 123 physical houses. The area of the village was given as 512 acres and it had a medical practitioner at that point.

The 1981 census recorded Raipur as having a population of 1,061 people, in 206 households, and having an area of 209.22 hectares. The main staple foods were given as wheat and rice.

The 1991 census recorded Raipur as having a total population of 1,051 people (526 male and 525 female), in 209 households and 209 physical houses. The area of the village was listed as 208 hectares. Members of the 0-6 age group numbered 132, or 13% of the total; this group was 55% male (72) and 45% female (60). Members of scheduled castes made up 33% of the village's population, while no members of scheduled tribes were recorded. The literacy rate of the village was 51% (346 men and 189 women). 321 people were classified as main workers (245 men and 76 women), while 0 people were classified as marginal workers; the remaining 730 residents were non-workers. The breakdown of main workers by employment category was as follows: 190 cultivators (i.e. people who owned or leased their own land); 75 agricultural labourers (i.e. people who worked someone else's land in return for payment); 1 worker in livestock, forestry, fishing, hunting, plantations, orchards, etc.; 0 in mining and quarrying; 0 household industry workers; 10 workers employed in other manufacturing, processing, service, and repair roles; 0 construction workers; 10 employed in trade and commerce; 0 employed in transport, storage, and communications; and 35 in other services.
