= Sherpur Upazila =

Sherpur শেরপুর
- Upazila
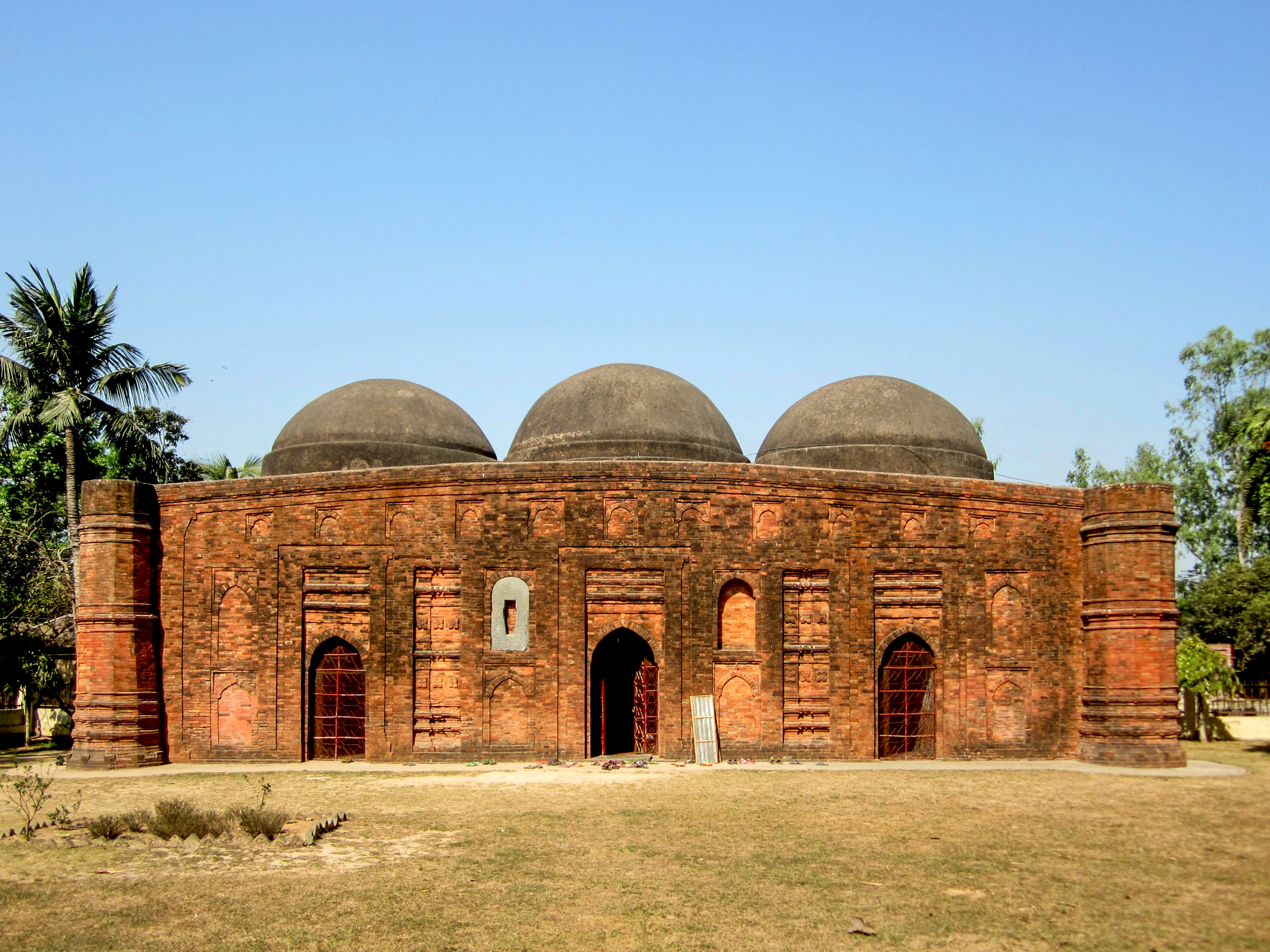
- Kherua Mosque

- Coordinates: 24°40′N 89°25′E
- Country: Bangladesh
- Division: Rajshahi
- District: Bogra

Area
  - Total: 295.93 km^{2} (114.26 sq mi)

Population (2022)
  - Total: 383,539
  - Density: 1,296.0/km^{2} (3,356.7/sq mi)
- Time zone: UTC+6 (BST)
- Postal code: 5840
- Area code: 051
- Website: sherpur.bogra.gov.bd(in Bengali)

Sherpur Upazila mauza geocode map

Sherpur Upazila (Bengali: শেরপুর উপজেলা) is an upazila (subdistrict) of Bogra District in Rajshahi Division, Bangladesh. Sherpur Thana was established in 1962 and was converted into an upazila in 1983. It is named after its administrative center, the town of Sherpur.

== History ==
Sherpur was reputedly named Sherpur after emperor Sher Shah Suri. However, according to Ain-i-Akbari, Sherpur was first established as the fort of Salimnagar, named after Prince Salim (later Emperor Jahangir), and served as a strategic Mughal frontier post before the conquest of south-eastern Bengal. Contemporary Persian sources referred to it as Sherpur Murcha to distinguish it from Sherpur in Mymensingh., whereas Murcha in Persia means battery. Tradition attributes the construction of a palace in Sherpur to Raja Man Singh during his campaigns against the rebel zamindar Pratapaditya. Sherpur remained an important town into the seventeenth century, appearing on Van den Broucke's 1660 map of Bengal, and later became a major administrative centre of the Rajshahi Raj. The site preserves extensive ruins of medieval mosques, palaces, and Hindu temples, including the Kherua Mosque, whose inscription records its construction by Mirza Murad Khan in 1571 during the reign of Akbar.

== Geography ==
Sherpur Upazila has a total area of 295.93 square kilometres (114.26 sq mi). It borders Shajahanpur Upazila to the north, Dhunat Upazila to the east, Sirajganj District to the south, Natore District to the south and west, and Nandigram Upazila to the west.

== Demographics ==
Historical population
Year	Pop. (000)	±%
1991	229	—
2001	286	+24.9%
2011	333	+16.4%
2022	386	+15.9%
2025	400	+3.6%
Source: Bangladesh Bureau of Statistics

According to the 2022 Bangladeshi census, Sherpur Upazila had 103,924 households and a population of 383,539. 8.00% of the population were under 5 years of age. Sherpur had a literacy rate (age 7 and over) of 68.04%: 71.74% for males and 64.43% for females, and a sex ratio of 98.37 males for every 100 females. 38,616 (10.07%) lived in urban areas. Ethnic population is 3,734 (0.98%), of which 1100 were Turi, and 1075 were Mahato.

According to the 2011 Census of Bangladesh, Sherpur Upazila had 81,753 households and a population of 332,825. 68,049 (20.45%) were under 10 years of age. Sherpur had a literacy rate (age 7 and over) of 43.03%, compared to the national average of 51.8%, and a sex ratio of 1011 females per 1000 males. 54,082 (16.25%) lived in urban areas. Ethnic population was 3,603 (1.08%).

=== Religion ===
Religions in Sherpur Upazila (2022)
Religion	Percent
Islam	91.46%
Hinduism	8.42%
Other or not stated	0.12%

Islam is the dominant religion of Sherpur Upazila.

== Notable sites ==
- Kherua Mosque, built in 1582, is an example of early Mughal architecture in Bengal. It is a symmetrical, single-aisled, three-bayed mosque with three domes.
- Bhabanipur Shakta pitha, one of seven Shakta pithas in Bangladesh, is a sacred site for the followers of Hinduism.
- Rural Development Academy.
Landscapes of Sherpur Upazila

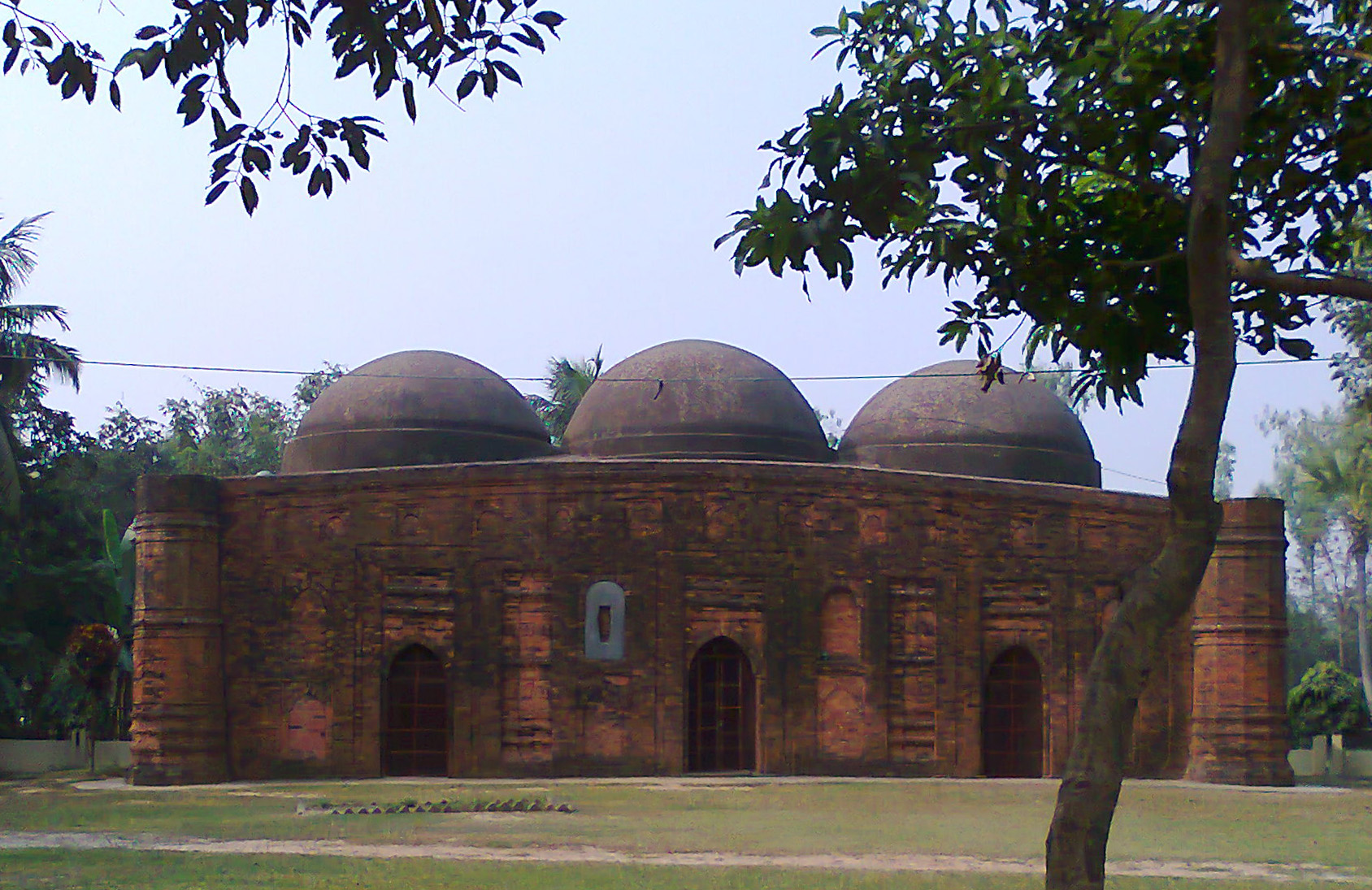
Kherua Mosque

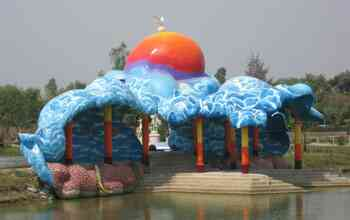
Saudia City Park is an amusement park in Sherpur

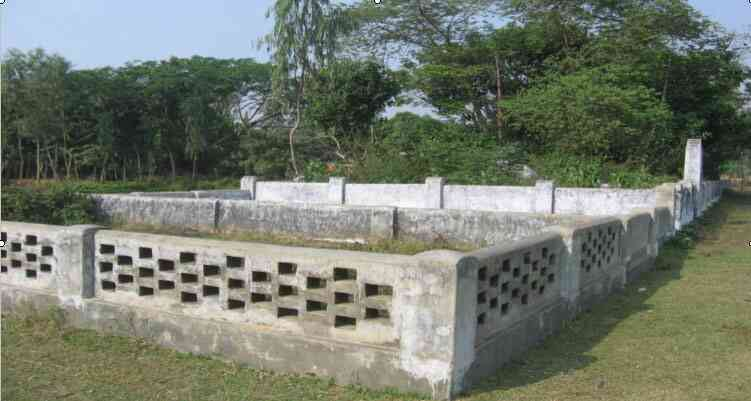
Freedom Fighter's Grave (Mass killing site at Darimokunda)

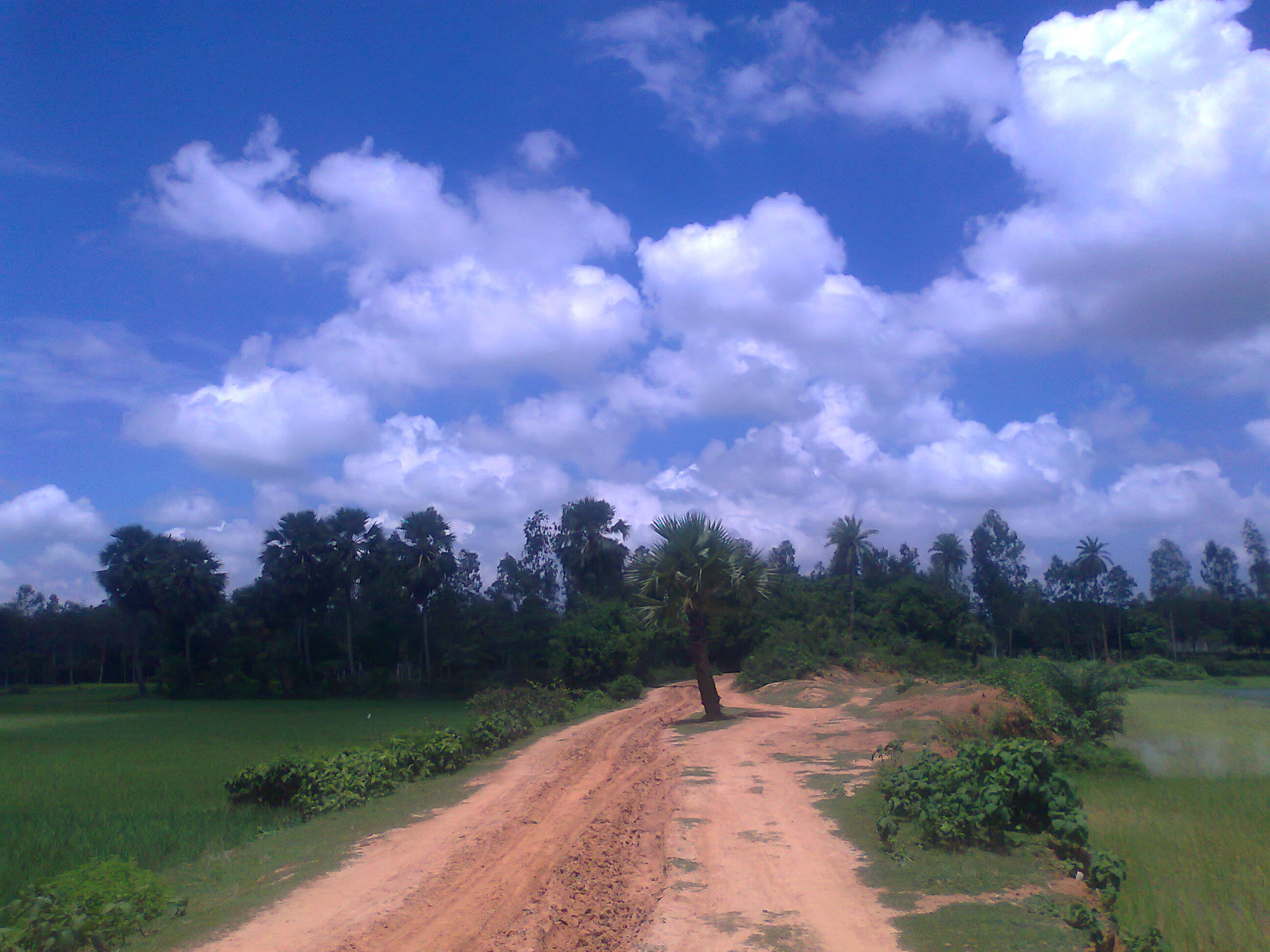
Village road in Autumn Season in Sherpur

== Economy ==
Main sources of income Agriculture 61.33%, non-agricultural labourer 2.97%, industry 1.44%, commerce 14.50%, transport and communication 4.47%, service 5.79%, construction 1.88%, religious service 0.16%, rent and remittance 0.27% and others 7.19%. Agricultural land Landowner 50.08%, landless 49.92%; agricultural landowner: urban 31.78% and rural 53.29%.'

== Administration ==
Administration Sherpur Thana was formed in 1962 and it was turned into an upazila in 1983. Sherpur Upazila is divided into Sherpur Municipality and 10 union parishads. The union parishads are:

- Bhabanipur Union Parishad
- Bishalpur Union Parishad
- Garidaha Union Parishad
- Khamarkandi Union Parishad
- Khanpur Union Parishad
- Kusumbi Union Parishad
- Mirzapur Union Parishad
- Shah-Bandegi Union Parishad
- Shimabari Union Parishad
- Sughat Union Parishad

The union parishads are subdivided into 220 mauzas and 322 villages.

In the 2009 upazila elections, Md Mujibur Rahman Majanu was elected Upazila Chairman, while MA Halim and Mosammat Ajmi Ara Parveenwere elected vice chairmen. The Upazila Nirbahi Officer (UNO), who administers the upazila for the central government, is AKM Sarwar Jahan.

Sherpur Municipality is subdivided into 9 wards and 19 mahallas.

== Education ==
There is a government college, eight non-government general colleges, five non-government technical colleges, 42 secondary schools, and three institutes in the upazila. Among them are 42 madrasas.

Local schools include Dhankundi Shahnaj Siraj High School and Polli Unnayan Academy Laboratory School & College

== See also ==
- Upazilas of Bangladesh
- Districts of Bangladesh
- Divisions of Bangladesh
