= Shankar Singh (Bihar politician) =

Indian politician

Member of Bihar Legislative Assembly
- In office 13 July 2024 – 14 November 2025
- Preceded by: Bima Bharti
- Succeeded by: Kaladhar Mandal
- Constituency: Rupauli
- In office 27 February 2005 – 22 November 2005
- Preceded by: Bima Bharti
- Succeeded by: Bima Bharti
- Constituency: Rupauli

Personal details
- Born: Aliganj, Purnia
- Party: Independent
- Other political affiliations: Lok Janshakti Party
- Spouse: Pratima Kumari
- Occupation: Politician and Social Worker

Shankar Singh is the member of Bihar Legislative Assembly from Rupauli, and is a politician and social worker hailing from Purnia, Bihar. He was earlier nominated as a candidate of the Lok Janshakti Party.

== Personal life ==
Shankar Singh is married to Pratima Kumari, who is the district chairwoman of the Hindustani Awam Morcha in Purnia. He belongs to a Hindu Rajput Family .

== Career ==
=== North Bihar Liberation Army ===
Following the murder of Butan Singh in 2000, and after the death of Don Tola Singh, Shankar's mentor the command of the North Liberation Army was taken over by Shankar Singh. The North Liberation Army was a Rajput militia formed by Butan Singh in opposition to the growing influence of Pappu Yadav in Purnia. Under Shankar Singh, the militia became politically influential by threatening and influencing voters as well as through booth capturing in the region. Upper caste candidates began seeking its support for their campaigns. The militia also groomed and supported Uday Pappu Singh who was inducted into the Bharatiya Janata Party and became the member of parliament from the Purnia constituency for two terms from 2004 to 2014. Shankar Singh was granted membership of the Lok Janshakti Party and stood as its candidate from the Rupauli constituency where he was elected in February 2005.

=== Rupauli by election 2024 ===
After the defeat in election after his membership of legislative council of Bihar was dismissed due to rashtrapati shashan in 2005 in Bihar, he continues to be in the people of Rupauli and always secured a good number of votes in every election either he was a runner or he got third position.

Things changed when he defeated the NDA candidate Kaladhar Mandal of JDU by more than 8000 and in the election the 5 time MLA Bima Bharti stood third.

He made the headlines through the country after this historic win over both the NDA and Indian National Developmental Inclusive Alliance (INDIA).

He was chosen MLA independent and made a great comeback in the politics.

His contact approach to people despite his continuous defeat after 2005 gave him this victory.
