= Banmankhi subdivision =

Administrative subdivision in Purnia district, Bihar, India

- Subdivision
- Location in Bihar, India Banmankhi subdivision (India)
- Coordinates: 25.8934687°N 87.1984159°E
- Country: India
- State: Bihar
- District: Purnia
- Headquarters: Banmankhi

Area
  - Total: 348.70 km^{2} (134.63 sq mi)

Population (2011)
  - Total: 321,079
  - Density: 920.79/km^{2} (2,384.8/sq mi)

Languages
  - Official: Hindi, Urdu
  - Regional: Maithili
- Time zone: UTC+5:30 (IST)
- PIN: 854202
- Vehicle registration: BR-11

Banmankhi subdivision is an administrative subdivision in the Purnia of Bihar, India. Its administrative headquarters is the town of Banmankhi. It is one of four subdivisions in Purnia district and consists predominantly of rural areas along with the main town of Banmankhi Bazar.

== Geography ==
Banmankhi subdivision lies in the fertile plains of north-eastern Bihar. The area is mostly flat, with alluvial soils and several small rivers and streams contributing to seasonal flooding during the monsoon. According to the Central Ground Water Board, the subdivision has multiple aquifers recharged by surface water.

== Administration ==
The subdivision is administered from Banmankhi town. It includes the following community development block:

- Banmankhi — Block headquarters: Banmankhi.

Administrative offices including the Sub-Divisional Officer (SDO) are located at the headquarters.

== Demographics ==
According to the 2011 Census, Banmankhi subdivision has an area of 348.70 km² and a population of 321,079, with 167,938 males and 153,141 females. The population of children aged 0–6 was 64,261. Scheduled Castes number 63,997 and Scheduled Tribes 18,191.

The effective literacy rate for the population aged 7 and above is approximately 50.15%, and the sex ratio is about 912 females per 1,000 males.

== Economy ==
The economy of Banmankhi subdivision is primarily agricultural. Most residents work as cultivators or agricultural labourers. Small-scale household industries and local markets (haats) in Banmankhi Bazar support trade and supply of agricultural goods. Industrial development is limited, with banking and commercial services concentrated in the town.

== Transport ==
Banmankhi subdivision is served by roads and rail. Banmankhi Junction connects the town to the East Central Railway network. District roads and nearby national and state highways link the villages to the subdivision headquarters. Public buses and local transport provide access to surrounding areas.

== Education and public services ==
The subdivision has numerous primary and middle schools across villages, while secondary and senior secondary schools are located in larger villages and Banmankhi Bazar. Health services include primary health centres and sub-health centres. Civic amenities such as post offices, drinking water, and electricity are detailed in the district census handbook.

== See also ==
- Bihar
- Purnia district
- Banmankhi
- Banmankhi block
