= Prahlad Stambh =

Legendary pillar in Hinduism

- प्रह्लाद स्तम्भ
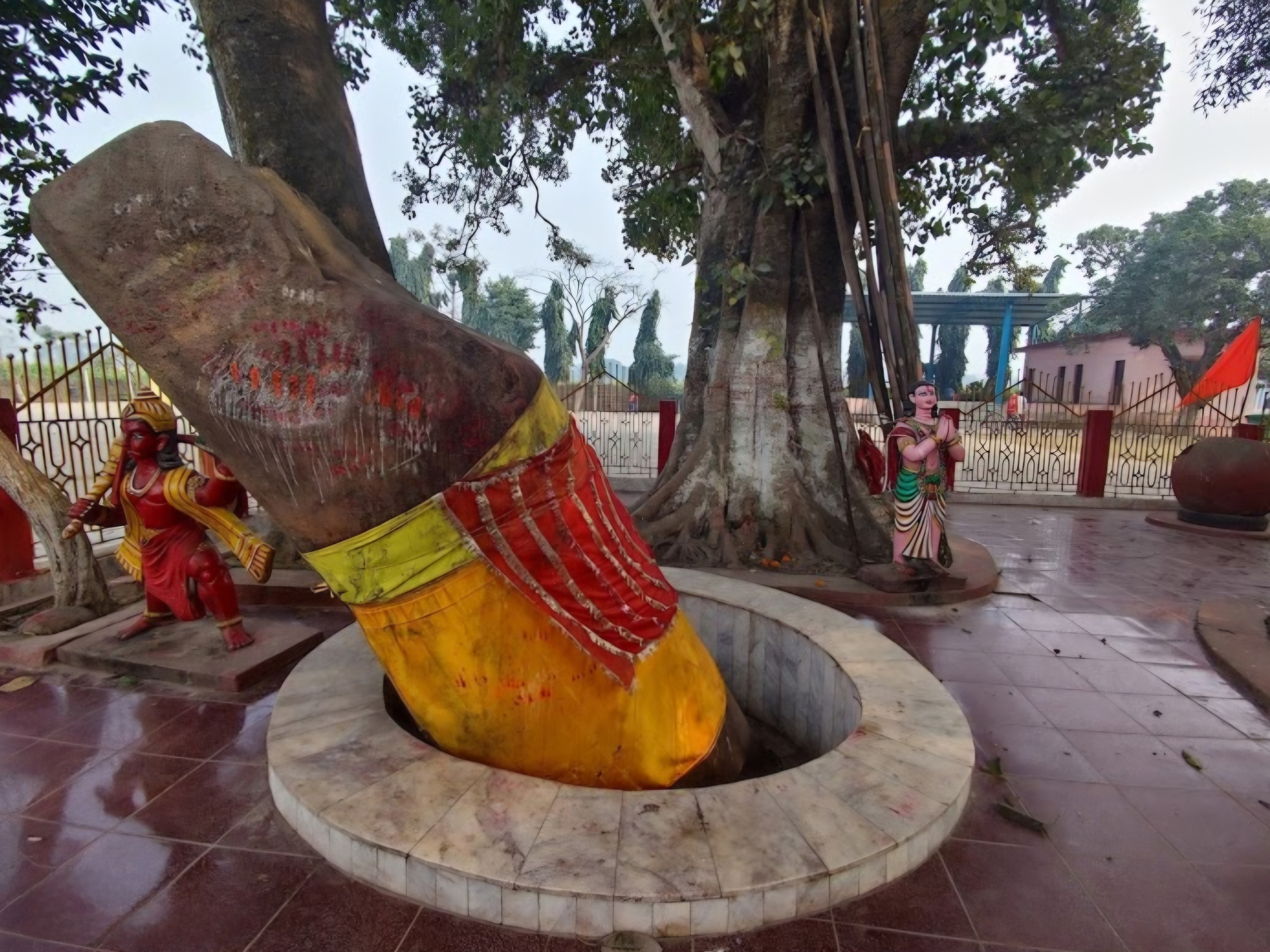
- View of the Prahlad Stambh in the premises of the Narsingh Mandir at Sikligadh Dharhara in Purnia

Religion
- Affiliation: Hinduism
- District: Purnia
- Region: Mithila
- Deity: Vishnu
- Festivals: Holika Dahan, Holi

Location
- Location: Prahlad Nagar, Sikligadh Dharhara
- State: Bihar
- Country: India
- Interactive map of Prahlad Stambh

Architecture
- Type: Ancient stone pillar

Prahlad Stambh (Maithili: प्रह्लाद स्तम्भ) also called as Manikya Stambh is a legendary stone pillar in the Mithila region of the Indian subcontinent. It is located in the premises of the Narsingh Mandir at Sikligadh Dharhara in the Banmankhi block of the Purnia district in the state of Bihar in India. According to Hindu adherents, it is believed that Vishnu himself took the incarnation of Narasimha here to protect his beloved devotee Prahlad. The length of this legendary pillar is approximately 1411 inches, major part of which is buried under the ground.

== Legend ==
The legendary pillar of Prahlad Stambh is associated with the legend of the Narasimha Avatar of Vishnu in Hinduism. According to legend, it is believed the remains of that pillar in Puranas which was torn apart and Vishnu appeared in the form of Narasimha in front of the Asura king Hiranyakashyapa. After the incarnation as Narasimha, he torn the chest of the Asura king Hiranyakashyapa there and killed him to death.

== History ==
During the Mughal period, attempts were made to uproot or topple this pillar with the help of elephants, but it remained unmoved. They were not able to uproot the legendary pillar. Even today, the pillar remains slightly tilted, a testimony to that struggle. In the complex of the temple, there is still ruined remains of a fort believed to be of the Asura King Hiranyakashipu. There is an ancient cave, where he is believed to have performed his tough penance dedicated to Shiva. Presently, the ancient cave is under the supervision of the Archaeological Survey of India.

== State recognition ==
The site of the Prahlad Stambh is believed to be the location where the first legendary festival of Holika Dahan was performed after the death of Holika, the sister of Asura King Hiranyakashipu. The most prominent Holika Dahan of the country is organised here. In the year 2017, the Government of Bihar recognised the festival of Holika Dahan at the premises of Prahlad Stambh as a state festival.

Since last 20 years, every year a 45 feet tall Holika statue is erected in the premises and it is burnt as the celebration of the festival Holika Dahan. It is claimed to be a unique celebration of the festival Holika Dahan in the country.
