= Madhavi Sarkar =

Indian politician

Madhavi Sarkar is an Indian politician, who served as a member of the Bihar Legislative Assembly 1998–2000.

== Political life ==
Madhavi Sarkar is the widow of Communist Party of India (Marxist) leader and member of the Bihar Legislative Assembly from the Purnia constituency Ajit Sarkar. Ajit Sarkar was murdered on 14 June 1998. Following Ajit Sarkar's death, Madhavi Sarkar was elected from the Purnia seat in a by-poll held in November 1998. As the governing Rashtriya Janata Dal (RJD) faced harsh pressure from the opposition parties over the killing of Ajit Sarkar, the party opted to support Sarkar in the by-poll. Sarkar obtained 45,541 votes (50.1%).

She lost the Purnia seat in the 2000 Legislative Assembly election. She finished in fourth place with 13,195 votes (11.15%). Her loss was attributed to a challenge from her brother-in-law amongst her support base.

Madhavi Sarkar subsequently left CPI(M), and joined the Communist Party of India (Marxist–Leninist) Liberation ahead of the 2004 parliamentary election (CPI(M) states that she was expelled, Sarkar herself argues that she left the party on her own will). Explaining her shift to CPI(M) to CPI(ML) Liberation, she stated that CPI(M) had become pro-feudal. CPI(ML) Liberation fielded her as their candidate for the Purnia parliamentary seat. In the election she contested against Pappu Yadav, the key accused in the murder of her husband. Speaking to media ahead of the election Sarkar vowed to continue the struggle to bring her husband's killers to justice, saying that "[t]he case is on in law courts. But I will get satisfaction only after the killer is tried in the people’s court and they take revenge for Ajit Sarkar’s gruesome murder". She obtained 7,595 votes (1.1% of the vote).

CPI(ML) Liberation fielded Sarkar as their candidate for the Purnia Legislative Assembly seat in the February 2005 Bihar election. She gathered merely 726 votes (0.6%). She did not contest the subsequent October 2005 Bihar Legislative Assembly election.

In November 2008 Sarkar was elected as national Vice President of the All India Agricultural Labourers Association (AIALA) at the third national conference of the organisation.

CPI(ML) Liberation fielded Sarkar for the Purnia parliamentary seat again in the 2009 Lok Sabha election. In this election CPI(ML) Liberation, CPI(M) and the Communist Party of India contested 33 Bihar seats jointly as the United Left Bloc. Sarkar obtained 5,125 votes (0.73%). Ahead of the election Sarkar requested the Election Commission of India to provide her with protection from Pappu Yadav, who had been granted bail two months prior to the election.

As of 2011, Sarkar was the Vice President of the All India Progressive Women's Association (AIPWA).
