= Jankinagar =

Village in Purnia, Bihar, India

- Village
- Location in Bihar, India Jankinagar (India)
- Coordinates: 25.8821816°N 87.1198369°E
- Country: India
- State: Bihar
- District: Purnia district
- Block: Banmankhi block

Government
  - Type: Panchayati Raj
  - Body: Gram Panchayat

Population (2011)
  - Total: 11,781

Languages
  - Official: Hindi, Urdu
- Time zone: UTC+5:30 (IST)
- PIN: 854102
- Vehicle registration: BR

Jankinagar is a village in Banmankhi block of Purnia district, in the state of Bihar, India. According to the 2011 Census of India, the village has a population of 11,781 residents living in 2,120 households.

== Geography ==
Jankinagar lies within Banmankhi block of Purnia district in north-eastern Bihar.

== Demographics ==
As per the 2011 Census of India:

- Total population: 11,781 (6,063 males and 5,718 females).
- Households: 2,120.
- Children (0–6 years): 2,356 (about 20% of the total population).
- Sex ratio: 943 females per 1,000 males (state average: 918).
- Child sex ratio (0–6 years): 998 (state average: 935).
- Literacy rate: 51.21% (male literacy 61.14%, female literacy 40.54%), below the state average of 61.80%.
- Scheduled Castes: 10.00% of the population.
- Scheduled Tribes: 9.37% of the population.

== Economy ==
According to census data, 5,512 residents are engaged in work activities.

- Main workers (employment more than 6 months): 2,433.
- Marginal workers (employment less than 6 months): 3,079.
- Among main workers: 1,178 were cultivators (owners or co-owners) and 852 were agricultural labourers.

Agriculture is the principal occupation of the village.

== Administration ==
Jankinagar is administered under the Panchayati raj system. The village governing body is the Gram Panchayat, headed by an elected Sarpanch.

== Transport ==
=== Rail ===
The area is served by the regional rail network managed by East Central Railway. Local passenger services and regional trains serve the Purnia–Banmankhi rail corridor; specific timetable details for Janakinagar station are available from railway enquiry portals.

=== Road ===
The village is connected by regional roads to nearby towns such as Banmankhi and Purnia.

== Postal services ==
The village is served by the Jankinagar Branch Office (BO) post office. The PIN code of the area is 854102.

== Education and healthcare ==
The 2011 Census does not list specific educational institutions or healthcare facilities in Jankinagar. Further details may be available from district education and health department records.
