= Koyadhu =

Kayadhu
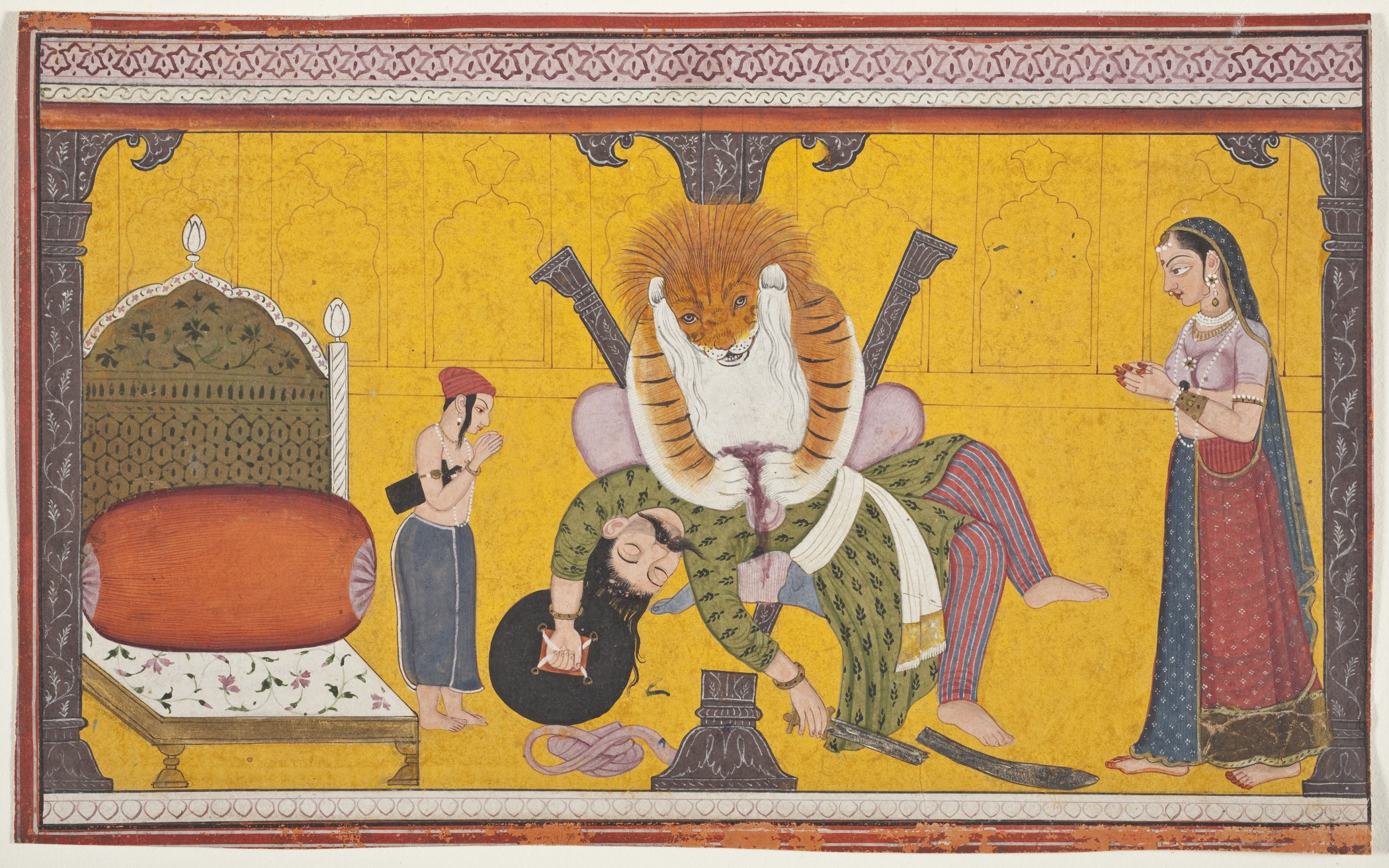
- A folio from a Bhagavata Purana manuscript at the Los Angeles County Museum of Art, depicting Kayadhu (right) witnessing the slaying of Hiranyakashipu by Narasimha.

In-universe information
- Aliases: Kamala, Jambhalika
- Race: Asura (Danava)
- Gender: Female
- Spouse: Hiranyakashipu
- Children: Prahlada (son); Anuhlada (son); Hlada (son); Samhlada (son); Simhika (daughter)
- Relatives: Jambhasura (father)

Kayadhu (Sanskrit: कयाधु) was a Danava princess in Hindu mythology. She was the daughter of Jambhasura, who is described as the brother of Mahishasura. Kayadhu was also known by the names Kamala and Jambhalika. According to the Bhagavata Purana, she was married to Hiranyakashipu, the king of the Asuras and the son of Diti and the sage Kashyapa. She bore him four sons—Hlada, Prahlada, Samhlada, and Anuhlada—and a daughter named Simhika. Simhika is notable in Hindu mythology as the mother of Rahu.

== Legend ==
According to Puranic narratives, during a time when Hiranyakashipu was away performing severe austerities, Indra and the celestial army of Devas launched an attack on his kingdom. The Devas temporarily seized control, plundered the realm, and abducted the pregnant Kayadhu, intending to hold her captive in Indraloka. Believing it to be a sin to harm a pregnant woman, they decided to wait until the child was born, with the ultimate intention of killing the newborn to prevent the rise of another powerful Asura. However, before Prahlada's birth, the divine sage Narada intervened. He revealed to Indra that the unborn child was destined to be a supreme devotee of Vishnu (Mahabhagavata), and therefore, it would be inappropriate to harm him.

Upon hearing Narada's counsel, Indra abandoned his plan and placed Kayadhu under the sage's protection. She stayed at Narada's hermitage (ashram) until Prahlada was born and Hiranyakashipu returned to reclaim his queen. During her stay, Narada regularly instructed the expectant mother on spiritual wisdom and divine knowledge. It is believed that the consciousness of an unborn child is influenced by the mother's environment and experiences; thus, the fetal Prahlada absorbed all of Narada's teachings while in the womb.

Consequently, despite being raised in the Asura school, where worldly desires, greed, and materialistic values were taught, the innate spiritual knowledge Prahlada acquired in the womb remained unaffected. This divergence in values led to a rift between the child and his father, Hiranyakashipu, who viewed his son's devotion to Vishnu as treason. Enraged, Hiranyakashipu made several attempts to execute Prahlada, but the child was miraculously saved by Vishnu each time. Ultimately, Vishnu assumed the Narasimha avatar (the half-man, half-lion incarnation) and slew the Asura king using his sharp claws on the threshold of the palace courtyards.
