= Purnia Assembly constituency =

Coordinates: 25°47′N 87°28′E

Purnia
- Constituency No. - for the Bihar Legislative Assembly

Constituency details
- Country: India
- Region: East India
- State: Bihar
- District: Purnia
- Established: 1951
- Total electors: 290,893
- Reservation: None

Member of Legislative Assembly
- 18th Bihar Legislative Assembly
- Incumbent Vijay Kumar Khemka
- Party: BJP
- Alliance: NDA
- Elected year: 2025

Purnia Assembly constituency is an assembly constituency in Purnia district in the Indian state of Bihar.

== Overview ==
As per Delimitation of Parliamentary and Assembly constituencies Order, 2008, No 62. Purnia Assembly constituency is composed of the following: Purnia East community development block including Purnia Municipal Corporation. In the 2015 Bihar Legislative Assembly election, Purnia was announced to be one of the 36 seats to have VVPAT enabled electronic voting machines.

Purnia Assembly constituency is part of No 12 Purnia (Lok Sabha constituency).

== Members of the Legislative Assembly ==
Year	Name	Party
1952	Kamaldeo Narain Sinha	Indian National Congress
1957	Kamaldeo Narain Sinha	Indian National Congress
1962	Kamaldeo Narain Sinha	Indian National Congress
1967	Kamaldeo Narain Sinha	Indian National Congress
1969	Kamaldeo Narain Sinha	Indian National Congress
1972	Kamaldeo Narain Sinha	Indian National Congress (O)
1977	Dev Nath Roy	Janata Party
1980	Ajit Sarkar	Communist Party of India (Marxist)
1985	Ajit Sarkar	Communist Party of India (Marxist)
1990	Ajit Sarkar	Communist Party of India (Marxist)
1995	Ajit Sarkar	Communist Party of India (Marxist)
1998^	Madhavi Sarkar	Communist Party of India (Marxist)
2000	Raj Kishore Kesri	Bharatiya Janata Party
2005	Raj Kishore Kesri	Bharatiya Janata Party
2005	Raj Kishore Kesri	Bharatiya Janata Party
2010	Raj Kishore Kesri	Bharatiya Janata Party
2011^	Kiran Devi	Bharatiya Janata Party
2015	Vijay Khemka	Bharatiya Janata Party
2020	Vijay Khemka	Bharatiya Janata Party
2025	Vijay Khemka	Bharatiya Janata Party

== Election results ==
=== 2025 ===
2020 Bihar Legislative Assembly election: Purnia
Party	Candidate	Votes	%	±%
BJP	Vijay Kumar Khemka	127,614	54.79	+2.01
INC	Jitendra Kumar Yadav	94,392	40.53	+5.11
JSP	Santosh Kumar Singh	3,701	1.59	
NOTA	None of the above	1,436	0.62	+0.11
Majority		33,222	14.26	−3.1
Turnout		232,919	80.07	+20.86
BJP hold		Swing	NDA	

=== 2020 ===
2020 Bihar Legislative Assembly election: Purnia
Party	Candidate	Votes	%	±%
BJP	Vijay Kumar Khemka	97,757	52.78	+3.52
INC	Indu Sinha	65,603	35.42	+3.72
SDPI	Vijay Oraon	5,493	2.97	
Apna Kisan Party	Sanjay Singh	1,924	1.04	
Independent	Neeraj Kumar Sinha	1,742	0.94	
NOTA	None of the above	951	0.51	−0.08
Majority		32,154	17.36	−0.2
Turnout		185,201	59.21	−6.68
BJP hold		Swing		

=== 2015 ===
2015 Bihar Legislative Assembly election: Purnia
Party	Candidate	Votes	%	±%
BJP	Vijay Kumar Khemka	92,020	49.26	
INC	Indu Sinha	59,205	31.7	
Independent	Ram Charitra Yadav	7,614	4.08	
CPI(M)	Rajeev Kumar Singh	3,993	2.14	
JAP(L)	Arvind Kumar@ Bhola Sah	2,670	1.43	
Independent	Ashok Kumar Singh	1,697	0.91	
NOTA	None of the above	1,109	0.59	
Majority		32,815	17.56	
Turnout		186,786	65.89	
