= Dhundh =

Hindu ritual

Dhundh (Devanagari: ढुन्ढ, IAST: Ḍhunḍh) is a Hindu ritual practiced in Rajasthan. It is performed for all children below one year old on Holi. This ritual may be similar to Punyajanam, which the Tamils perform for the naming ceremony of a newborn.

== History ==
Dhundh is linked to the Bhavishya Purana, which described an incident involving a rakshasi demon named Dhundh during the reign of King Raghu. Abiding to Guru Vashishtha, people kindled fire at various spots to keep the demoness away. Thus the Lord's name and fire kept the demoness away - so on this day, children make mischief.

== Ceremony ==
The child is symbolically 'married' to Holika after the burning of holi. In the evening, people (called Gerias) come to the child's paternal home. The child is dressed in new clothes and is placed in the lap of relatives on the Bajotia (a wooden seat). The Gerias then dance around the child and beat on a cloth used to cover the child. The child's family then gives sweets to the Gerias.
