= Eloji =

Folk deity of Rajasthan, India

Eloji (Eloba)
- Village deity (Gram-devta)
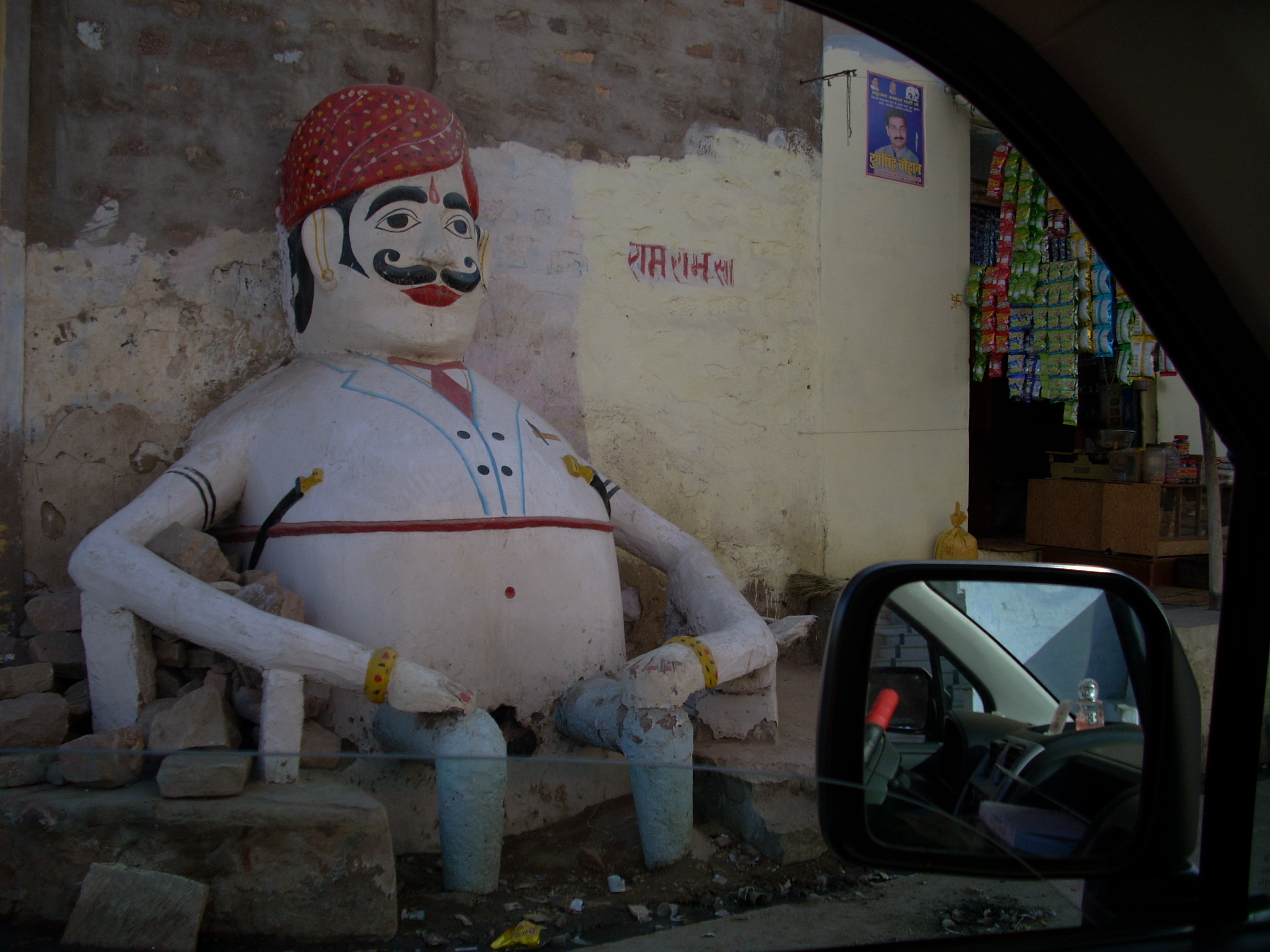
- Statute of Eloji
- Festivals: Holi

Eloji or Eloba is a Gram-devta (god of village) folk deity. Statues of Eloji can be found in villages of Rajasthan. He is said to be the lover of Hiranyakashipu's sister Holika.

== Holi folklore ==
Holi is a festival of abandonment and acknowledgement of animal instincts. In Indian society, honestly discussing sex is still taboo; public expression of love or sexual desire is condemned. The love story of Eloji and Holika is famous in traditional folklore.
