= Rupauli Assembly constituency =

Coordinates: 25°54′34″N 87°10′35″E

Rupauli
- Constituency No. 60 for the Bihar Legislative Assembly

Constituency details
- Country: India
- Region: East India
- State: Bihar
- District: Purnia
- Lok Sabha constituency: Purnia Lok Sabha constituency
- Established: 1951
- Total electors: 298,673
- Reservation: None

Member of Legislative Assembly
- 18th Bihar Legislative Assembly
- Incumbent Kaladhar Mandal
- Party: JD(U)
- Alliance: NDA
- Elected year: 2025
- Preceded by: Shankar Singh; *Won as : Independent

Rupauli Assembly constituency is an assembly constituency in Purnia district in the Indian state of Bihar.

== Overview ==
As per Delimitation of Parliamentary and Assembly constituencies Order, 2008, No 60. Rupauli Assembly constituency is composed of the following: Rupauli and Bhawanipur community development blocks; Aurlaha, Bhatsara, Laxmipur, Nathpur, Patraha, Arbanna Chakla, Thari and Basudeopur of Barhara Kothi CD Block.

Rupauli Assembly constituency is part of No 12 Purnia (Lok Sabha constituency).

== Members of the Legislative Assembly ==
Year	Name	Party
1952	Mohit Lal Pandit	Socialist Party
1957	Brij Bihari Singh	Indian National Congress
1962	Brij Bihari Singh	Indian National Congress
1967	Chhavi Nath Sharma	Communist Party of India
1969	Anandi Prasad Singh	Indian National Congress
1972	Anandi Prasad Singh	Indian National Congress
1977	Shaligram Singh Tomar	Janata Party
1980	Dinesh Kumar Singh	Indian National Congress (I)
1985	Dinesh Kumar Singh	Indian National Congress
1990	Saryug Mandal	Independent
1995	Bal Kishore Mandal	Communist Party of India
2000	Bima Bharti	Independent
2005	Shankar Singh	Lok Janshakti Party
2005	Bima Bharti	Rashtriya Janata Dal
2010	Bima Bharti	Janata Dal (United)
2015	Bima Bharti	Janata Dal (United)
2020	Bima Bharti	Janata Dal (United)
2024^	Shankar Singh	Independent
2025	Kaladhar Mandal	Janata Dal

^By-Poll

== Election results ==
=== 2025 ===
2025 Bihar Legislative Assembly election: Rupauli
Party	Candidate	Votes	%	±%
JD(U)	Kaladhar Mandal	124,826	55.45	▲20.93
RJD	Bima Bharti	51,254	22.77	
Independent	Shankar Singh	29,986	13.32	
Independent	Shankar Ram	3,115	1.38	
JSP	Amod Kumar	3,048	1.35	
NOTA	None of the above	5,862	2.6	▲0.09
Majority		73,572	32.68	▲22.31
Turnout		225,095	75.37	▲14.68
JD(U) gain from Independent		Swing		

=== 2024 ===
Bye-election, 2024: Rupauli
Party	Candidate	Votes	%	±%
Independent	Shankar Singh	68,070	39.97	
JD(U)	Kaladhar Mandal	59,824	35.13	
RJD	Bima Bharti	30,619	17.98	
NOTA	None of the above	5,717	3.36	+0.84
Majority		8,246	4.84	
Turnout		1,70,311	52.75	
Independent gain from JD(U)		Swing		

=== 2020 ===
2020 Bihar Legislative Assembly election: Rupauli
Party	Candidate	Votes	%	±%
JD(U)	Bima Bharti	64,324	34.52	▲6.39
LJP	Shankar Singh	44,994	24.15	
CPI	Vikas Chandra Mandal	41,963	22.52	▲16.76
Independent	Kaladhar Prasad Mandal	6,197	3.33	
Independent	Premparkash Mandal	5,593	3.0	
Independent	Nilam Devi	4,077	2.19	
Jan Adhikar Party	Deepak Kumar Sharma	3,134	1.68	
Independent	Manoj Kumar Bharti	2,363	1.27	
Rashtriya Secular Majlis Party	Md. Quamruz Zaman	1,762	0.95	
NOTA	None of the above	4,686	2.51	▲1.25
Majority		19,330	10.37	▲5.03
Turnout		186,336	60.69	▼1.07
JD(U) hold		Swing		

=== 2015 ===
2015 Bihar Legislative Assembly election: Rupauli
Party	Candidate	Votes	%	±%
JD(U)	Bima Bharti	50,945	28.13	
BJP	Prem Prakash Mandal	41,273	22.79	
Independent	Shankar Singh	34,793	19.21	
CPI	Shavan Kumar	10,426	5.76	
Independent	Parmanand Singh	8,497	4.69	
Independent	Vasdev Sharma	4,567	2.52	
JAP(L)	Kiran Devi	3,639	2.01	
Independent	Dipak Kumar Sharma	3,522	1.94	
BSP	Ketan Kumar Singh	2,757	1.52	
Independent	Kumar Manoranjan	2,746	1.52	
CPI(ML)L	Bindeshwari Sharma	2,587	1.43	
Independent	Sanjeev Jaiswal	2,402	1.33	
Independent	Surya Narayan Singh Yadav	2,043	1.13	
Independent	Sund Kant Bhagat	1,906	1.05	
NOTA	None of the above	2,277	1.26	
Majority		9,672	5.34	
Turnout		181,130	61.76	
JD(U) hold		Swing		

=== 2010 ===
In the 2010 state assembly elections, Bima Bharti of JD(U) won the Rupauli assembly seat defeating her nearest rival Shankar Singh of LJP. Contests in most years were multi cornered but only winners and runners up are being mentioned. Bima Bharti representing RJD defeated Shanakar Singh of LJP in October 2005. Shankar Singh of LJP defeated Bima Bharti of RJD in February 2005. Bima Bharti, contesting as an independent candidate defeated Md. Alimuddin of SP in 2000. Bal Kishor Mandal of CPI defeated Ram Chandra Das of SP in 1995. Saryug Mandal, Independent, defeated Jai Krishna Singh of BJP in 1990. Dinesh Kumar Singh of Congress defeated Saryug Mandal of CPI in 1985 and 1980. Shaligram Singh Tomar of JP defeated Saryug Mandal of CPI in 1977.
