= Santosh Kumar Kushwaha =

Indian politician (born 1976)

Santosh Kumar

Member of the Indian Parliament for Purnia
- Preceded by: Uday Singh
- Succeeded by: Pappu Yadav
- In office 16 May 2014 – 2019
- In office 2019–2024

National General Secretary of Janata Dal (United).
- Incumbent
- Assumed office March 2023

Personal details
- Born: 5 February 1976 (age 50) Kocheili, Purnia district, Bihar
- Party: Rashtriya Janata Dal
- Spouse: Madhulata Devi
- Children: Sarthak Kumar, Viraj Kushwaha

Santosh Kumar (born 5 February 1976, alias Santosh Kushwaha) is an Indian politician and a former Member of Parliament representing the Purnia constituency in Bihar. He was first elected in the 2014 Indian general election, having run as the Janata Dal (United) candidate in the constituency. In 2010 he was also elected as Member of Legislative assembly of the Baisi (Vidhan Sabha constituency) of Purnea district as a Bharatiya Janata Party candidate. One month before 2014 lok sabha election he joined JD(U) as he was nominated as the party candidate for Lok Sabha election for Purnea constituency.

== Life and political career ==
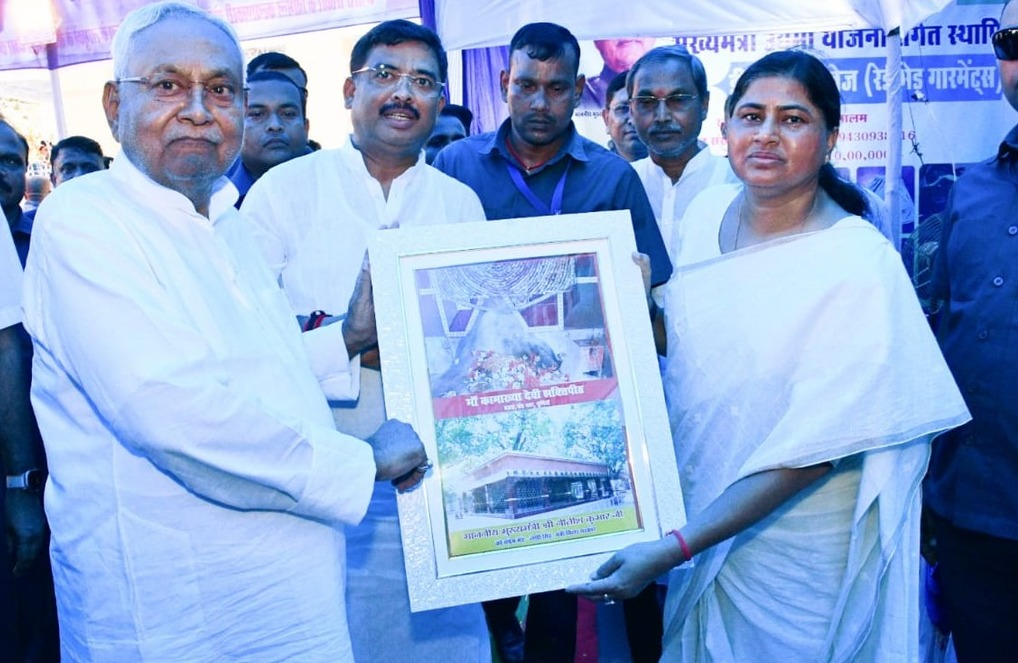
Santosh Kushwaha with Leshi Singh and Bihar Chief Minister Nitish Kumar during an event on 24 August 2024.

Born to Nevilal Vishwash and Ramsakhi Devi in 1976, Santosh's education was completed in Purnea from Surya Narayan Singh college, Rambagh. He has been an agriculturist and social worker before starting his career as a full-time politician. He has been an MLA of Baisi, Purnea Bihar before being elected as Member of Parliament in 2014. Further, he has been associated with various important committees of the Parliament and important posts within Janata Dal (United). He has served as Member of Standing Committee on Personnel, Public Grievances, Law and Justice, Committee on Private Members` Bills and Resolutions, Member of Consultative Committee, Ministry of Coal, Member of Standing Committee on Petroleum and Natural Gas, Member, Committee on Welfare of Other Backward Classes, Member, Standing Committee on Petroleum and Natural Gas and Member of Rules Committee.

In 2019, he was re-elected as Member of Parliament from Purnea Lok Sabha constituency for a second term. He is a follower of Ram Manohar Lohia's ideology. He defeated Uday Singh Pappu in 2019 Lok Sabha elections with a large margin of over 2.5 Lakh votes. In 2019, Santosh was one of the nominee of Janata Dal (United) for ministerial post in new Narendra Modi ministry. However, JD(U) later decided not to claim ministerial birth due to fewer seats allotted to its members as ministers.

In 2024 Indian General Elections, Kushwaha was repeated as the candidate of National Democratic Alliance from Purnia Lok Sabha constituency. Although Rashtriya Janata Dal fielded his former aide Beema Bharti, who was earlier a member of Janata Dal (United), against him, Pappu Yadav also contested the election as independent candidate. It was speculated that Yadav being a popular face in the region may make the contest triangular. In this election, Pappu Yadav defeated him by 30k votes.

Denied ticket from Janata Dal United in 2025 Bihar Legislative Assembly elections, he joined Rashtriya Janata Dal in the presence of Tejaswi Yadav. He was fielded as a candidate of RJD from Dhamdaha Assembly constituency against JDU's Leshi Singh. However, he was defeated by Singh in this election. This happened despite Purnia MP Pappu Yadav himself campaigning for Kushwaha against Singh.

== Controversies ==
=== 2016 Awadhesh Mandal escape incident ===
Kushwaha was allegedly involved in helping Awadhesh Mandal, the husband of Janata Dal (United) Member of Legislative Assembly, Beema Bharti to escape from police custody in Purnia. Mandal, a gangster, who was wanted in over hundred criminal cases, was also accused of being involved in a murder case, in connection with which, he subsequently threatened the widow of the deceased. After he was caught by the Police and taken to a police station in Purnia, Beema Bharti accompanied by Santosh Kushwaha and over hundred of supporters reached the police station. It was alleged that while Kushwaha was engaged in conversation with the police officials, Bharti helped her husband to escape in her SUV.

== Personal life ==
In his election affidavit submitted to Election Commission of India before 2024 Indian General Elections, Kushwaha declared ownership of immovable assets valued in crores of rupees. He is also fond of guns and owns two licensed weapons.

== See also ==
- List of members of the 16th Lok Sabha
- List of members of the 17th Lok Sabha
