= Progressive Democratic Alliance (Bihar) =

Alliance of political parties in India

The Progressive Democratic Alliance (PDA) is a political alliance of Indian center-left political parties formed in 2020 Bihar Legislative Assembly election. The coalition was led by the Jan Adhikar Party (Loktantrik) from 2020-2024 and then the party got merged into Indian National Congress.

== Candidates ==
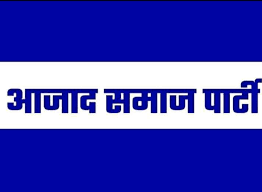
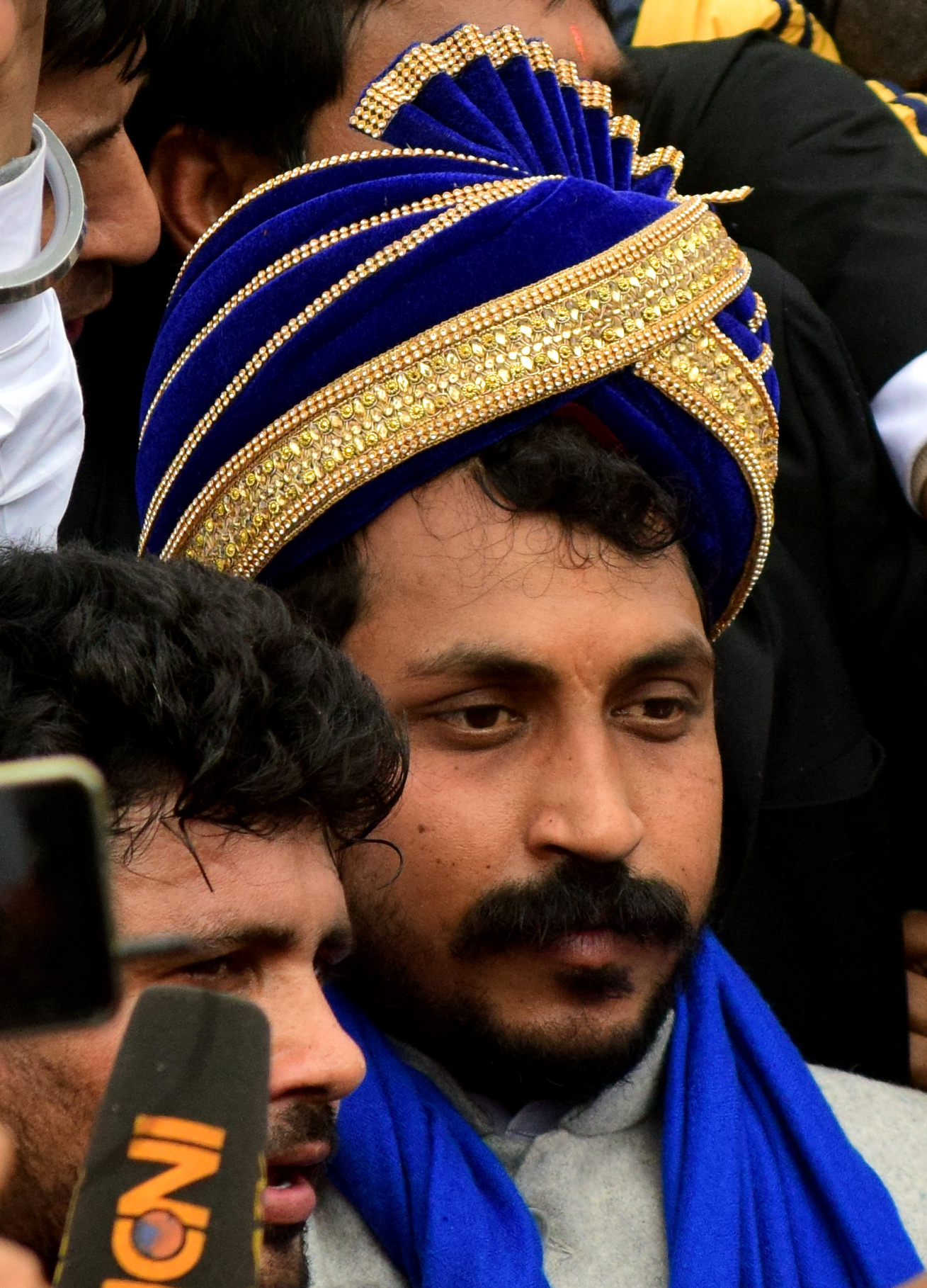
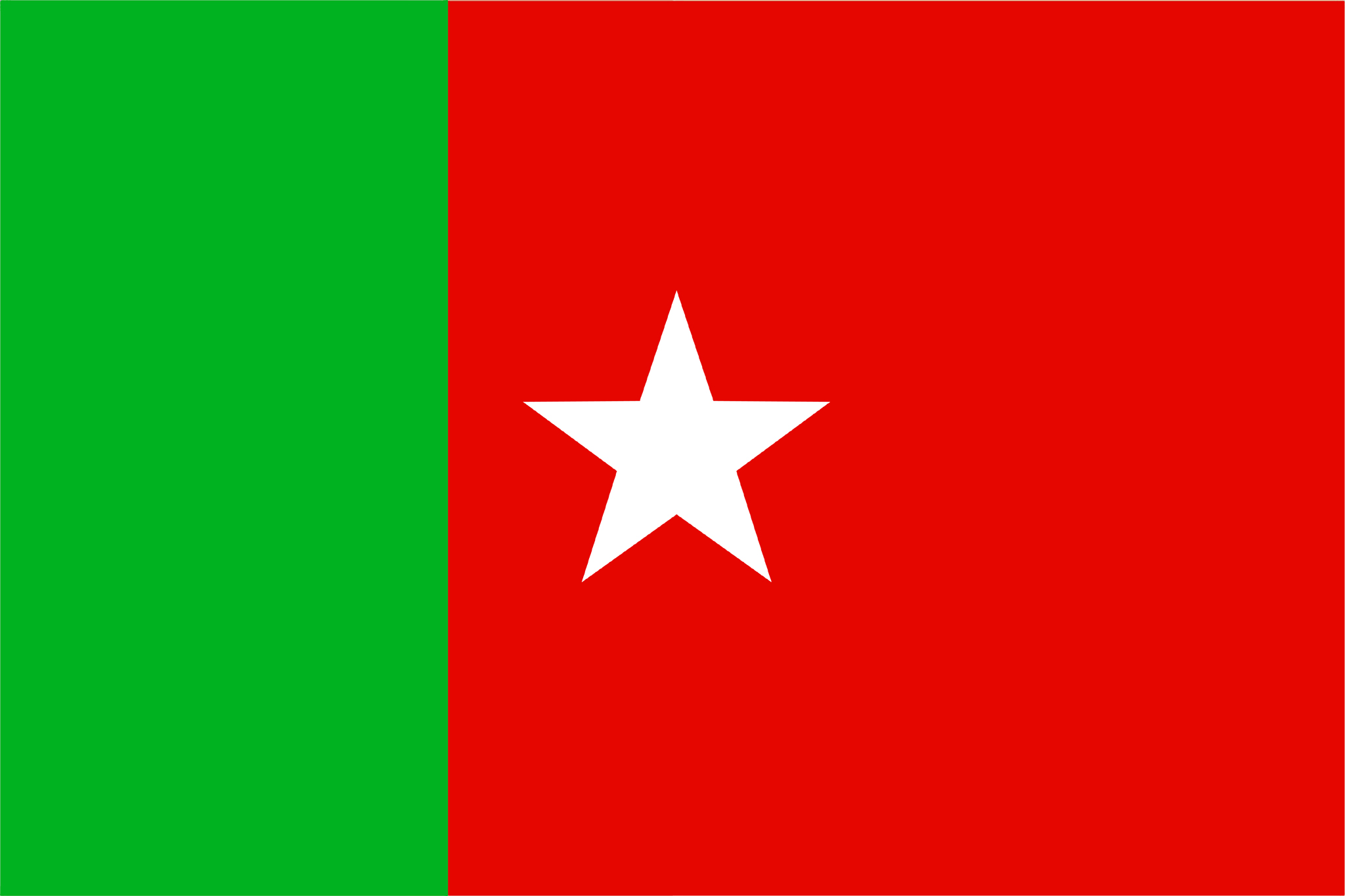
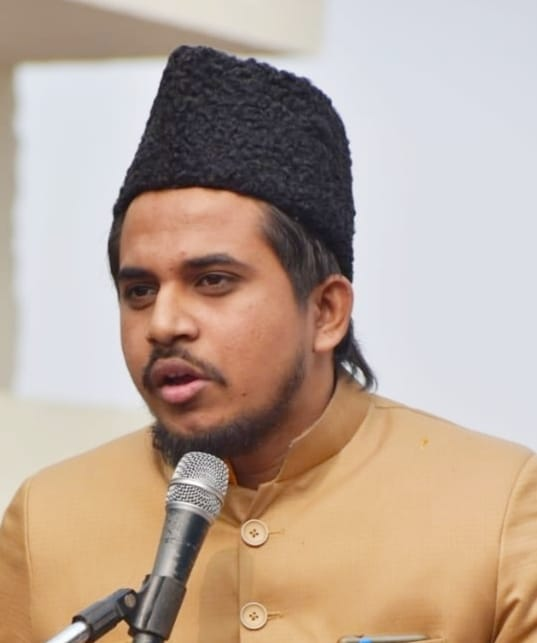
No.	Party	Flag	Symbol	Photo	Leader	Seats contested
1.	Jan Adhikar Party (Loktantrik)				Pappu Yadav
2.	Azad Samaj Party				Chandrashekhar Azad Ravan
3.	Social Democratic Party of India				MK Faizey
4.	Bahujan Mukti Party				V. L. Matang
5.	Muslim Arakshan Morcha				Perwez Siddiqui

== See also ==
- Grand Democratic Secular Front
- Mahagathbandhan (Bihar)
- National Democratic Alliance
