= Belkhara =

- village
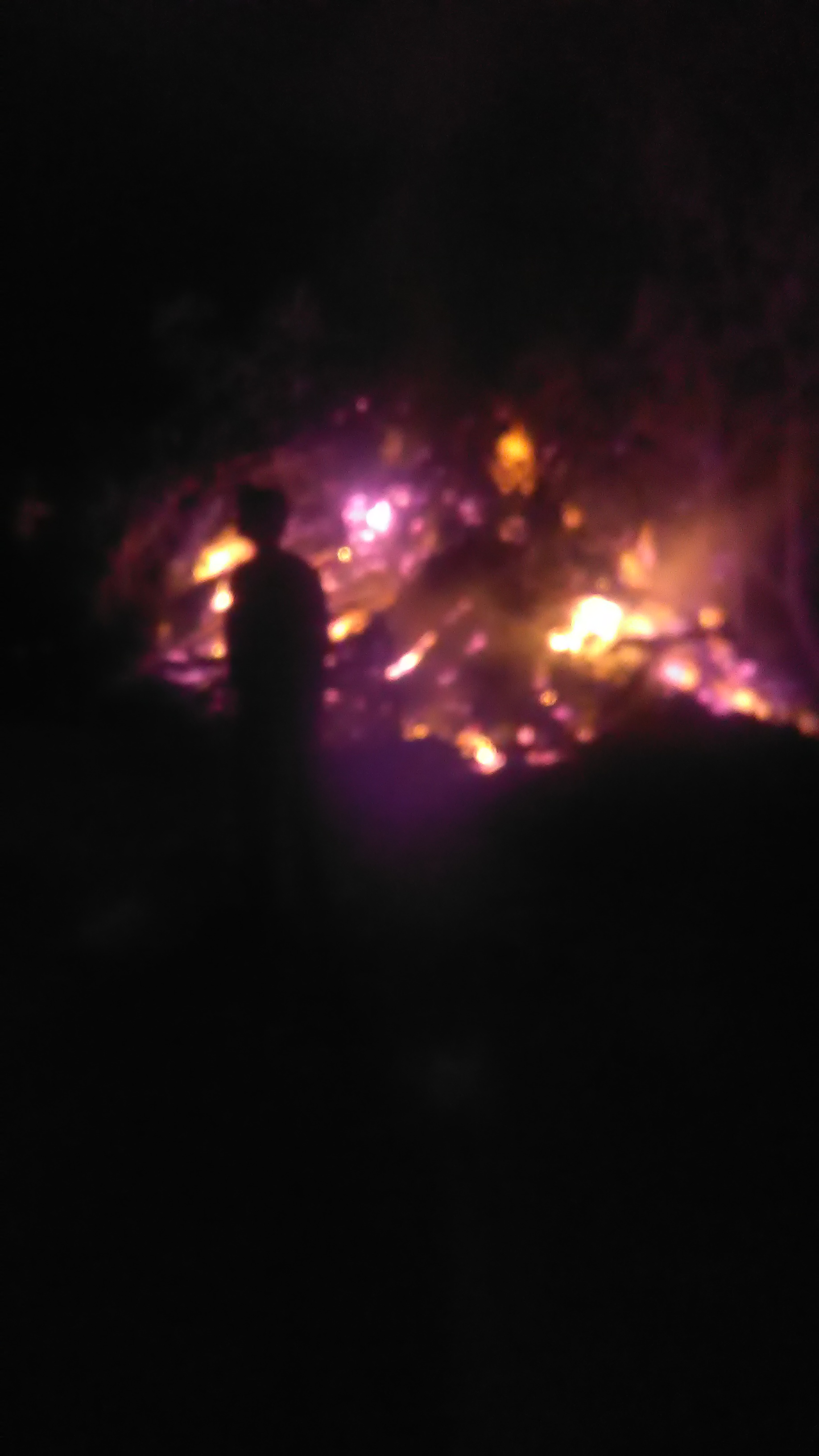
- Holika Dahan in 2017

- Location in Bihar, India Belkhara (India)
- Coordinates: 25.14976°N 84.63352°E
- Country: India
- State: Bihar
- District: Arwal
- Block: Karpi

Government
  - Body: Panchayat

Languages
  - Official: Hindi
- Time zone: UTC+5:30 (IST)
- PIN: 804428
- ISO 3166 code: IN-BR

Belkhara is a village as well as a panchayat in the Arwal district of Bihar, India.[1] It is situated 11 km north east of district headquarters Arwal.

The village has few historical monuments too, but many of them are mostly unknown to others.

== Access ==
The village is not connected by railways. Private buses and other private transporting owned by individuals are only source of transport. The nearest railway station is at Jehanabad, 44 km away.

== Language ==
Most of the natives here use Magahi as mode of communication. All the official works are carried out in Hindi.

== Governing ==
Belkhara is part of panchayati Raj system. Mr Suryamal Prasad is village Head man
