= Banmankhi (community development block) =

- Block
- Location in Bihar, India Banmankhi (India)
- Coordinates: 25°53′0″N 87°11′0″E
- Country: India
- State: Bihar
- Region: Mithila
- District: Purnia
- Elevation: 37 m (121 ft)

Population
  - Total: 280,542

Languages
  - Regional: Maithili
- Time zone: UTC+5:30 (IST)
- PIN: 854202
- Telephone code: 06467
- Vehicle registration: BR11
- Nearest city: Purnia
- Lok Sabha constituency: Purnia
- Climate: 23-38 (Köppen)
- Avg. summer temperature: 38 °C (100 °F)
- Avg. winter temperature: 23 °C (73 °F)

Banmankhi is a block in Purnia district of Bihar state, India.

== Demographics ==
Languages in Banmankhi C.D. Block (2011)
1. Maithili (41.1%)
2. Hindi (40.8%)
3. Urdu (6.97%)
4. Santali (4.25%)
5. Others (6.81%)

== Geography ==
Banmankhi is located at an elevation of 37 m above mean sea level.

The town was famous for its sugar mills in the past but now it is most famous for cattle, where nearly 1,000 such as buffalo, cow, goat and many pet animals are for sale. Places of tourist interest include Prahalad Khamba (an ancient history about why Indians celebrate Holi festivals,) Maharshi Mehi asharam (including the birthplace and Meditation Ashram) and Kajha Kothi, Kali Bari Mandir, Railway Matha Asthan. This place is known for its festival in holi time.

== Location ==
Banmankhi is located 34 km from the District Headquarter Purnia. NH 231 passes through Banmankhi. The railway access point is Banmankhi Junction Railway Station.There are daily trains to Purnia, Saharsa, Bihariganj, Patna, Gaya, and Ranchi. The nearest airports are Darbhanga Airport, Patna Airport and Bagdogra Airport located at 162 km, 324 km and 193 km away respectively. Purnea Airport (ICAO: VEPU) is located 32 km from Banmankhi.

== See also ==
Chandpur Bhangaha
