= Kaladhar Mandal =

Indian politician

Member of Bihar Legislative Assembly
- Incumbent
- Assumed office 14 November 2025
- Preceded by: Shankar Singh
- Constituency: Rupauli

Personal details
- Party: Janata Dal (United)
- Spouse: Anandhi Mandal
- Profession: Farmer

Kaladhar Mandal is an Indian politician and a member of the Bihar Legislative Assembly. He is a resident of Rupauli town in Purnia District. Kaladhar Mandal obtained his bachelor's degree from Vinayaka Missions University, located in Salem, Tamil Nadu. He belongs to the Janata Dal (United) party. In the 2025 Bihar Assembly elections, he successfully contested and won the election from the Rupauli Assembly constituency, becoming a Member of the Legislative Assembly (MLA).He hails from Hindu Gangota Community.

== 2025 ==
2025 Bihar Legislative Assembly election: Rupauli
Party	Candidate	Votes	%	±%
JD(U)	Kaladhar Mandal	124,826	55.45	
RJD	Bima Bharti	51,254	22.77	
Independent	Shankar Singh	29,986	13.32	
NOTA	None of the above	5,862	2.60	
Majority		73,572	32.68	
Turnout		225,095	63.11	
JD(U) gain from Independent		Swing		
