= Ajit Sarkar =

Indian politician

Member of Bihar Legislative Assembly
- In office 1980–1998
- Preceded by: Dev Nath Roy
- Succeeded by: Madhavi Sarkar
- Constituency: Purnia

Personal details
- Born: 1947; Purnea, Bihar, India
- Died: 14 June 1998 (aged 50–51); Purnea, Bihar, India
- Political party: CPI(M)
- Spouse: Madhavi Sarkar
- Children: 3

Ajit Sarkar (Bengali: অজিত সরকার) (1947 – 14 June 1998) was an Indian politician who was a member of the Communist Party of India (Marxist).

== Political career ==
He entered politics through the Students' Federation of India, the CPI(M)’s student wing, and is still remembered in these parts as a firebrand leader who took up the cause of the landless and the poor.

He represented Purnia four times in the Bihar Legislative Assembly between 1980 and 1998 for 18 years until 14 June 1998 when he was gunned down with his driver Harendra Sharma and party worker Ashfaqur Rehman in broad daylight at Subhash Nagar by Pappu Yadav in Purnia.

His story was shown in one of the episodes of Satyamev Jayate on politics.

== Personal life ==
His son Amit Sarkar has been living in Australia with his Australian wife and 2 kids. He dwelt in politics for some time.
