= Raj Kishore Kesri =

Indian politician

Raj Kishore Kesri (died 2011) was an Indian politician from the Bharatiya Janata Party in Bihar. He was accused of rape and sexual exploitation by school principal Rupam Pathak, who stabbed him to death in January 2011. He represented the Purnia in the state legislature.

The initial police investigation, carried out by the state was widely accused of being politically motivated, especially when the news editor who had first published the rape news was arrested. Bihar Chief Minister Nitish Kumar has asked for a probe by the Central Bureau of Investigation which is taking up the investigation.

Rupam Pathak has been awarded life imprisonment for the murder.
