= Jai Krishna Mandal =

Indian politician

Member of Parliament, Lok Sabha
- In office 10 March 1998 – 26 April 1999
- Preceded by: Pappu Yadav
- Succeeded by: Pappu Yadav
- Constituency: Purnia

Personal details
- Born: 1 December 1950 (age 74) Barahari, Purnia district, Bihar
- Political party: Bharatiya Janata Party
- Spouse: Sushma Mandal
- Parent: Raghubar Mandal (father)
- Education: Bachelor of Arts
- Alma mater: Bihar National College

Jai Krishna Mandal is an Indian politician from Bihar who represented Purnia in the Lok Sabha from 1998 to 1999. However he lost the subsequent election to Pappu Yadav.
