= Banmankhi =

- Town
- Location in Bihar, India
- Coordinates: 25.8833°N 87.1833°E
- Country: India
- State: Bihar
- Region: Mithila
- District: Purnia

Government
  - Type: Municipal Council
  - Body: Banmankhi Municipal Council
  - Chairperson: Sanjana Devi
  - MLA: Krishna Kumar Rishi (BJP)

Population (2011)
  - Total: 30,336

Languages
  - Official: Hindi
  - Additional official: Urdu
  - Regional: Maithili
- Time zone: UTC+5:30 (IST)
- PIN: 854202
- Lok Sabha constituency: Purnia
- Vidhan Sabha constituency: Banmankhi

Banmankhi is a town and a municipality in Purnia district in the state of Bihar, India. It is well known for its closed sugar mill, the incarnation site of Lord Narsimha, and its famous annual Holika Dahan celebration in the state.

== Geography ==
Banmankhi is situated 32 km away from Purnea, the district town.

Banmankhi is also a Sub-divisional headquarter.

== Demographics ==
As of 2011 India census, Banmankhi had a population of 30,336. Males constitute 52.13% of the population and females 47.87%. Banmankhi Bazar has an average literacy rate of 74.35%, higher than the national average of 73%; with 80.72% of the males and 67.28% of females literate. 18% of the population is under 6 years of age.

Religions in Banmankhi (2011)
Religion	Percent
Hinduism	82.02%
Islam	17.52%
Christianity	0.17%
Sikhism	0.01%
Jainism	0.19%
Buddhism	0.02%
Others	0.07%

=== Languages ===
Languages in Banmankhi
1. Hindi (47.1%)
2. Maithili (37.3%)
3. 'Other' Hindi (6.00%)
4. Santali (3.99%)
5. Urdu (3.92%)
6. Bengali (0.35%)
7. Others (1.35%)

At the time of 2011 census, Hindi was spoken by 47.15% of the population, followed by Maithili at 37.27%. 6.00% of the population spoke languages categorised as 'Other' under Hindi, 3.99% Santali, 3.92% Urdu, 0.35% Bengali, and 1.35% other languages.

== Tourism ==
Banmankhi has many tourist sites associated with Hinduism, such as the Narsimha Temple at Sikligarh, Dharhara and Dhimeshwar Dham. It's also the ancestral place of Maharshi Mehi Baba [Prominent Santmat Figure ]. These sites are well-known throughout the state.

Narsimha Temple at Sikligarh Dharhara has the 1411 long Manikya stambha (pillar) also known as Prahlad Stambh, from which the Lord Vishnu manifested Narsimha (half lion and half man) avatara. This temple complex has ruins which is said to be the fort of Hiranyakashipu and a cave where Lord Shiva is said to have meditated. The temple has a unique tradition, after Holika Dahan (Holi bonfire) at the temple the ashes are sprayed in the air as the sign of victory of good over evil, and people play Holi with the Holika Dahan bonfire ashes and this tradition is locally called the dhurkhel (hindi: धुरखेल).

== Economy ==
Banmankhi is known for its famous sugar mill, which was established in 1967. However, it has not been functional for the past three decades. This mill once provided employment to people in the region. Now, the land of the mill has been taken over by BIADA(Bihar Industrial Area Development Authority).

== Transportation ==
=== Road ===
Banmankhi is connected with Purnia, Madhepura, Saharsa and Dhamdaha (Subdivision of Purnia District) through highway. The town is served by NH 231.

=== Railway ===
Banmankhi Junction railway station is a railway station of Banmankhi. It lies between Saharsa–Purnia line of East Central Railway. This station is connected to Purnia, Katihar, Saharsa, Patna, Kolkata, Darbhanga, Delhi, Amritsar and Ranchi.
