= Madhuri Singh =

Indian politician (1923–1989)

Member of Parliament, Lok Sabha
- In office 1980–1989
- Preceded by: Lakhan Lal Kapoor
- Succeeded by: Mohammed Taslimuddin
- Constituency: Purnea, Bihar

Personal details
- Born: 13 January 1923 Bishnupur Village, Purnea, Bengal Presidency, British India
- Died: 31 December 1989 (aged 66) Patna, Bihar, India
- Party: Indian National Congress
- Spouse: Tribhuvan Prasad Singh ICS(1936 BATCH)
- Children: 6 (including Uday Singh)

Madhuri Singh (née Chand; 13 January 1923 – 31 December 1989) was an Indian politician. She was elected to the Lok Sabha, lower house of the Parliament of India from Purnea, Bihar in 1980 and 1984 as a member of the Indian National Congress. Singh died in Patna on 31 December 1989, at the age of 66.

== Biography ==
She was the daughter of the feudal lord Veer Narayan Chand (Mol Babu).
