= Purnia Lok Sabha constituency =

Lok Sabha constituency in Bihar, India

Coordinates: 25.8°N 87.5°E

Purnia
- Lok Sabha constituency

Constituency details
- Country: India
- Region: East India
- State: Bihar
- Established: 1952
- Reservation: None

Member of Parliament
- 18th Lok Sabha
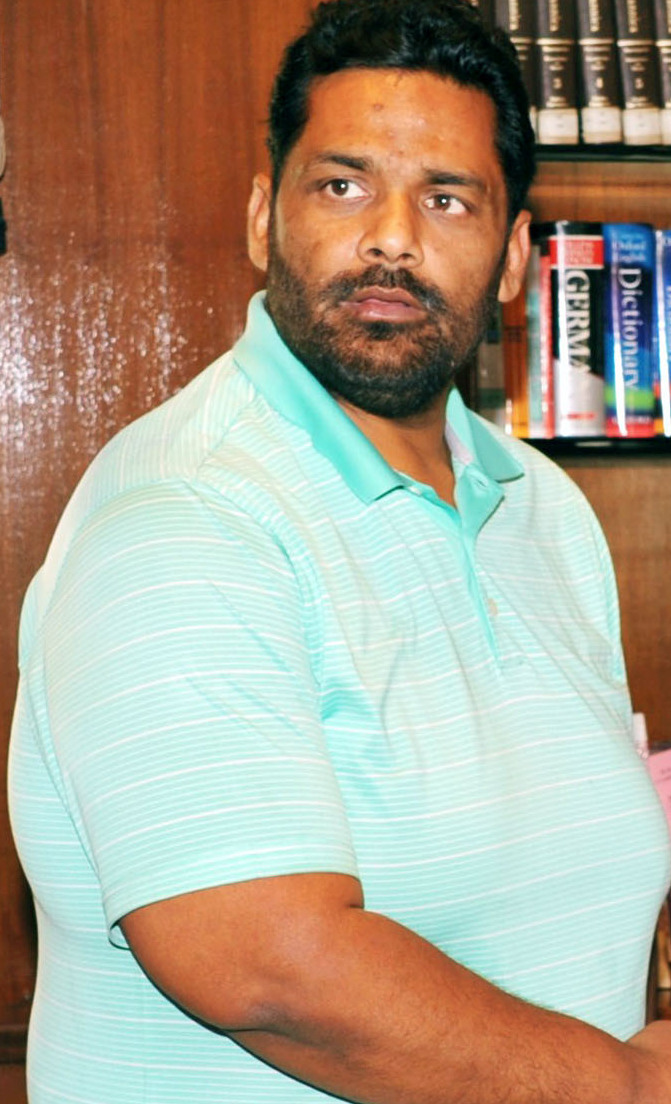
- Incumbent Pappu Yadav
- Party: IND
- Alliance: INDIA
- Elected year: 2024
- Preceded by: Santosh Kushwaha; JD(U)

Purnia (formerly Purnea) is one of the 40 Lok Sabha (parliamentary) constituencies in Bihar state in eastern India.

Most successful parties from Purnia Lok Sabha
1. INC(7 times) (33.0%)
2. BJP (3 times) (17.0%)
3. IND (2 times) (17.0%)
4. JDU (2 times) (11.0%)
5. SP (1 time) (6.00%)
6. JD (1 time) (6.00%)
7. JP (1 time) (5.00%)
8. INC(I) (1 time) (5.00%)

== Assembly segments ==
Presently, Purnia Lok Sabha constituency comprises the following six Vidhan Sabha (legislative assembly) segments:

#	Name	District	Member	Party	2024 lead
58	Kasba	Purnia	Nitesh Kumar Singh	LJP(RV)	Independent
59	Banmankhi (SC)	Purnia	Krishna Kumar Rishi	BJP	Independent
60	Rupauli	Purnia	Kaladhar Mandal	JD(U)	JD(U)
61	Dhamdaha	Purnia	Leshi Singh	JD(U)	JD(U)
62	Purnia	Purnia	Vijay Khemka	BJP	Independent
69	Korha (SC)	Katihar	Kavita Paswan	BJP	Independent

== Members of Parliament ==
The following is the list of the Members of Parliament elected from this constituency

Year	Name	Party
1952	Phani Gopal Sen Gupta	Indian National Congress
1952	Maneklal Madanlal Gandhi	Indian National Congress
1952	Benjaman Hansda	Indian National Congress
1952	Muhammad Islamuddin	Indian National Congress
1957	Phani Gopal Sen Gupta	Indian National Congress
1962	Phani Gopal Sen Gupta	Indian National Congress
1967	Phani Gopal Sen Gupta	Indian National Congress
1971	Mohammad Tahir	Indian National Congress
1977	Lakhan Lal Kapoor	Janata Party
1980	Madhuri Singh	Indian National Congress (I)
1984	Madhuri Singh	Indian National Congress
1989	Taslimuddin	Janata Dal
1991	Election countermanded due to poll-rigging and violence	
1991^	Pappu Yadav	Independent
1996	Pappu Yadav	Samajwadi Party
1998	Jai Krishna Mandal	Bharatiya Janata Party
1999	Pappu Yadav	Independent
2004	Uday Singh	Bharatiya Janata Party
2009	Uday Singh	Bharatiya Janata Party
2014	Santosh Kushwaha	Janata Dal (United)
2019	Santosh Kushwaha	Janata Dal (United)
2024	Pappu Yadav	Independent

^By-Poll

== Election results ==
=== 2024 ===
2024 Indian general elections: Purnia
Party	Candidate	Votes	%	±%
Independent	Pappu Yadav	567,556	47.46	▲47.46
JD(U)	Santosh Kumar Kushwaha	5,43,709	45.47	▼9.38
RJD	Bima Bharti	27,120	2.27	▲2.27
Margin of victory		23,847	1.99	▼20.84
Turnout		11,96,238	63.12	▼2.25
Independent gain from JD(U)		Swing		

=== 2019 ===
2019 Indian general elections: Purnia
Party	Candidate	Votes	%	±%
JD(U)	Santosh Kumar Kushwaha	632,924	54.85	
INC	Uday Singh	3,69,463	32.02	
IND.	Shubhash Kumar Thakur	31,795	2.76	
IND.	Sageer Ahmad	21,374	1.85	
NOTA	None of the above	18,569	1.61	
BSP	Jitendra Urab	16,537	1.43	
Majority		2,63,461	22.83	
Turnout		11,53,989	65.37	
JD(U) hold		Swing		

=== 2014 ===
2014 Indian general elections: Purnia
Party	Candidate	Votes	%	±%
JD(U)	Santosh Kumar Kushwaha	418,826	41.15	
BJP	Uday Singh	3,02,157	29.69	
INC	Amarnath Tiwari	1,24,344	12.22	
JMM	Mohammed Shamsher Alam	50,446	4.96	
AAP	Sudeep Roy	16,630	1.63	
NOTA	None of the above	11,982	1.18	
Majority		1,16,669	11.46	
Turnout		10,17,750	64.31	
JD(U) gain from BJP		Swing		

=== 2009 ===
2009 Indian general elections: Purnia
Party	Candidate	Votes	%	±%
BJP	Uday Singh	362,952	51.50	
IND.	Shanti Priya Chandranarayan Yadav	1,76,725	25.08	
LJP	Shankar Jha	22,773	3.23	
IND.	Pramod Narayan Poddar	21,754	3.09	
BSP	Naveen Kumar Singh	21,281	3.02	
Majority		1,86,227	26.42	
Turnout		7,04,752	53.99	
BJP hold		Swing		

=== General Election, 2004 ===
2004 Indian general elections: Purnia Lok Sabha constituency
Party	Candidate	Votes	%	±%
BJP	Uday Singh	244,426	34.47	
LJP	Rajesh Ranjan alias Pappu Yadav	231,543	32.66	
Independent	Jeevachha Paswan	57,021	8.04	
SP	Dr. Irshad Ahmad Khan	47,301	6.67	
JDP	Raj Kumar Hembram	25,609	3.61	
Independent	Awadesh Ku Mandal	21,619	3.05	
Independent	Satya Narayan Ram	18,378	2.59	
Independent	Neelam Devi	16,569	2.34	
SJP(R)	Jai Krishna Mandal	14,160	2.00	
BSP	Syed Sahid Raja	7,976	1.12	
CPI(ML)L	Madhavi Sarkar	7,595	1.07	
Independent	Lalit Mohan Singh	6,740	0.95	
Independent	Md. Riauzuddin	4,056	0.57	
AD(K)	Prakash Kumar Singh	3,302	0.47	
RLD	Upendra Nath Sagar	2,720	0.38	
Majority		12,883	1.81	
Turnout				
BJP hold		Swing		

=== General Election, 1999 ===
1999 Indian general elections: Purnia Lok Sabha constituency
Party	Candidate	Votes	%	±%
Independent	Rajesh Ranjan	438,193	63.17	
BJP	Jay Krishna Mandal	185,627	26.76	
CPI(M)	Abdul Khalil Ahmad	29,799	4.30	
Independent	Mani Lal Das	12,813	1.85	
Independent	Mahmad Alam	5,166	0.74	
JMM	Ashok Ku Sah	4,298	0.62	
JD(S)	Alimudin Ansari	3,211	0.46	
Independent	Nageshwar Singh	3,207	0.46	
BSP	Juver Alam	3,032	0.44	
Ajeya Bharat Party	Vipeen Kumar	2,727	0.39	
Independent	Kuldeep Mandal	1,946	0.28	
Independent	Sahdeo Prasad Mandal	1,401	0.20	
Independent	Asha Devi	1,374	0.20	
NCP	Saiyad Gulam Husen	924	0.13	
Majority		252,566	36.41	
Turnout				
Independent hold		Swing		

== See also ==
- Purnia district
- List of constituencies of the Lok Sabha
- Kolasi
- Katihar
