= Vijay Kumar Khemka =

Indian politician

Member of Bihar Legislative Assembly
- Incumbent
- Assumed office 2015
- Preceded by: Kiran Devi
- Constituency: Purnia

Personal details
- Born: 22 June 1959 (age 66)
- Party: Bharatiya Janata Party
- Occupation: Politician

Vijay Kumar Khemka is an Indian politician from Bharatiya Janata Party, Bihar and a two term Member of Bihar Legislative Assembly from Purnia Assembly constituency.
