= Chandpur Bhangaha =

Coordinates: 25°55′N 87°01′E

Chandpur Bhangaha Chandpur Bangaha
- Village
- Nickname: Mithila Dham
- Location in Bihar, India Chandpur Bhangaha (India)
- Country: India
- State: Bihar
- District: Purnia District
- Region: Mithila (Kosi—Seemanchal subregion)

Languages
  - Official: Maithili, Hindi, Urdu
- Time zone: UTC+5:30 (IST)

Chandpur Bhangaha (also romanized as Chandpur Bhangha or Chandpur Bangaha) is a village in the Purnia district of Bihar, India.
