= Sikligarh =

Archeological site in Purnia

- सिकलीगढ़ (Maithili)
- Sikligadh
- Type: Archaeological site
- Location: Banmankhi Block
- Region: Mithila

Site notes
- Area: 200 acres (81 ha)

Sikligarh (Maithili: सिकलीगढ़) or Sikligadh is an ancient archeological site in the Mithila region of the Indian subcontinent. It is located in the Banmankhi block of the Purnia district in the state of Bihar in India. It is spread over 200 acres of land surrounded by mud rampart. It is an important archeological site in Bihar which has yielded NBP ware.
