= Uday Singh =

Indian politician

1st National President of the Jan Suraaj Party
- Incumbent
- Assumed office 19 May 2025
- Preceded by: Office established

Member of the Indian Parliament for Purnia
- In office 2004–2014
- Preceded by: Rajesh Ranjan
- Succeeded by: Santosh Kushwaha

Personal details
- Born: 9 November 1952 (age 73) Patna, Bihar, India
- Party: Jan Suraaj Party
- Other political affiliations: Indian National Congress (2019–2022); Bharatiya Janata Party (until 2019)
- Spouse: Ruby Singh
- Children: 1 son and 1 daughter

Uday Singh (born 9 November 1952) is an Indian politician who is currently serving as the 1st National President of the Jan Suraaj Party since May 2025. He previously represented the Purnia constituency of Bihar in the 14th and 15th Lok Sabha as a member of the BJP from 2004 to 2014. In January 2019, Singh resigned from the BJP, citing dissatisfaction with the party's direction and leadership under Prime Minister Narendra Modi. He subsequently joined the Indian National Congress in March 2019.

== Personal life ==
Singh was born into a prominent political family in Purnia, Bihar. His mother, Madhuri Singh, was a two-term Member of Parliament from Purnia, elected in 1980 and 1984 as a member of the Indian National Congress. His maternal grandfather, Veer Narayan Chand, also known as Mol Babu, was a major landowner in the region, reportedly possessing over 18,000 acres of land.
