= Jan Adhikar Party (Loktantrik) =

- Abbreviation: JAP (L)
- President: Pappu Yadav
- Founder: Pappu Yadav
- Founded: 9 May, 2015
- Dissolved: 2024
- Split from: Rashtriya Janata Dal
- Merged into: Indian National Congress
- Headquarters: Ward No. 05/14, Vardhman Hata, Arjun Bhawan, Arjun Nagar, Purnia, Bihar- 854301
- Colours: Green
- ECI status: Registered Unrecognised Party
- Alliance: Socialist Secular Morcha (2015–2020); Progressive Democratic Alliance(2020–2024)

Jan Adhikar Party (Loktantrik); English: People's Rights Party (Democratic) was a political party in Bihar, India. The party was formed by Indian politician Pappu Yadav in May 2015.

Pappu Yadav was a Member of Parliament from Madhepura and was expelled from Rashtriya Janata Dal for years due to anti-party activities. The party was launched just before 2015 Bihar Legislative Assembly election. Pappu Yadav campaigned against Nitish-Lalu Alliance, but didn't secure any assembly seat in the state legislative assembly.

In 2024, before general election he merged his party in Indian National Congress.

== History ==
Jan Adhikar Party (L) fought on 64 seats as part of Socialist Secular Morcha which comprises Samajwadi Party, Nationalist Congress Party, National People's Party, Samajwadi Janata Dal Democratic and Samras Samaj Party.

The party was not able to win a single seat in 2015 Bihar Legislative Assembly election and collected 1.04% of vote in the election.

== 2020 Bihar Elections ==
Election Commission of India provided new symbol 'scissors' in Bihar Assembly Election 2020. JAP(L) contested under Progressive Democratic Alliance.

== See also ==
- List of political parties in India
