= Bima Bharti =

Indian politician

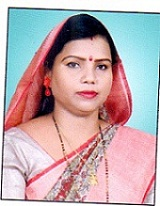

Minister of Sugarcane industries, Bihar
- In office 3 June 2019 – 16 Nov 2020

Member of Bihar Legislative Assembly
- In office November 2005 – 13 July 2024
- Preceded by: Shankar Singh
- Succeeded by: Shankar Singh
- Constituency: Rupauli
- In office November 2000 – February 2005
- Preceded by: Bal Kishore Mandal
- Succeeded by: Shankar Singh
- Constituency: Rupauli

Personal details
- Born: 1 January 1973 (age 53)
- Party: Rashtriya Janata Dal (2024 – present)
- Other political affiliations: Janata Dal (United) (till 2024)
- Spouse: Awadhesh Mandal

Bima Bharti (born 1 January 1973) is an Indian politician and the former Minister of Sugarcane Industries in the Government of Bihar. She is a leader of the Rashtriya Janata Dal since 2024 after leaving Janata Dal (United). She was a member of Bihar Legislative Assembly elected as the representative of the Rupauli constituency 4 times from November 2000 onward. Shankar Singh had defeated her in February 2005 but she was re-elected in October 2005.

== Political career ==
Bima Bharti began her political career in 2000. She contested as an independent candidate from the Rupauli constituency and was elected to the Bihar Legislative Assembly. Subsequently, she became a member of the Rashtriya Janata Dal. In the February 2005 election, she lost the seat to Shankar Singh of the Lok Janshakti Party but in the following October election, she was able to win back the seat. She subsequently quit the Rashtriya Janata Dal and joined the Janata Dal (United) before the 2010 Bihar Legislative Assembly election. She was re-elected in 2010 and again in 2015 as a member of the Janata Dal (United). She has resigned from Janata Dal (United) and joined Rastriya Janta Dal (RJD) ahead of 2024 general election.

Bima Bharti contested from Purnia Lok Sabha constituency as RJD candidate and lost to Independent Candidate Pappu Yadav. She contested as RJD candidate in Rupauli constituency by poll and stood at third place.

== Personal life ==
Bharti is married to Awadhesh Mandal who was convicted of intimidation of witnesses in a murder case. In January 2015, she helped her husband, who had multiple criminal cases against him, escape from jail. Her 21-year-old son was discovered dead in August 2018. Another son was beaten in 2019. Bharati is an animal lover, in 2023, she came into limelight after she took out funeral procession of her pet dog.
