= Holika Dahana =

Hindu festival symbolizing the victory of good over evil

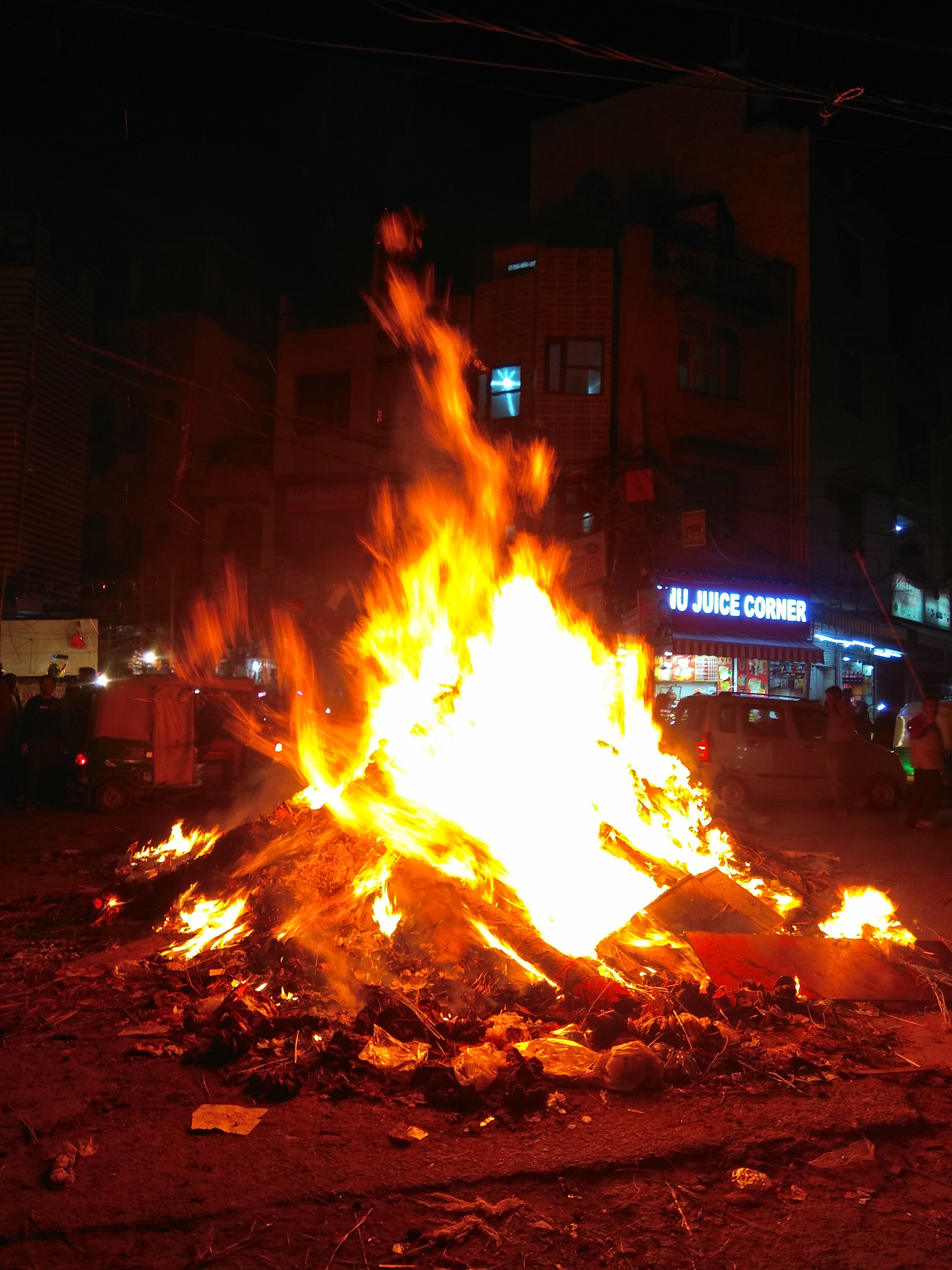
- Holi Bonfire at Shri Ram Chowk, I.P Extension, Delhi.
- Observed by: Hindus
- Type: Hindu and indian
- Significance: Victory of righteousness over unrighteousness Incineration of Kamadeva into ash by Shiva
- Celebrations: Bonfires, celebrations
- Date: Fourteenth day of the waxing half of the Hindu month Phalguna
- Related to: Holi

Holi bonfire on Holi eve in Delhi, 2012

Holika Dahana (Sanskrit: होलिकादहन, romanized: Holikādahana, lit. 'Burning of Holika'), is a Hindu festival in which a bonfire is lit to celebrate the burning of the demoness Holika. This ritual is symbolic of victory of good over evil. It precedes Holi, the festival of colours, which celebrates the spring season. According to legend, Holika was the sister of Hiranyakashipu, who acquired a boon that rendered her invulnerable to fire. She then attempted to kill her nephew, Prahlada, by placing him on her lap in a bonfire. However, she was immolated while Prahlada was saved from the fire.

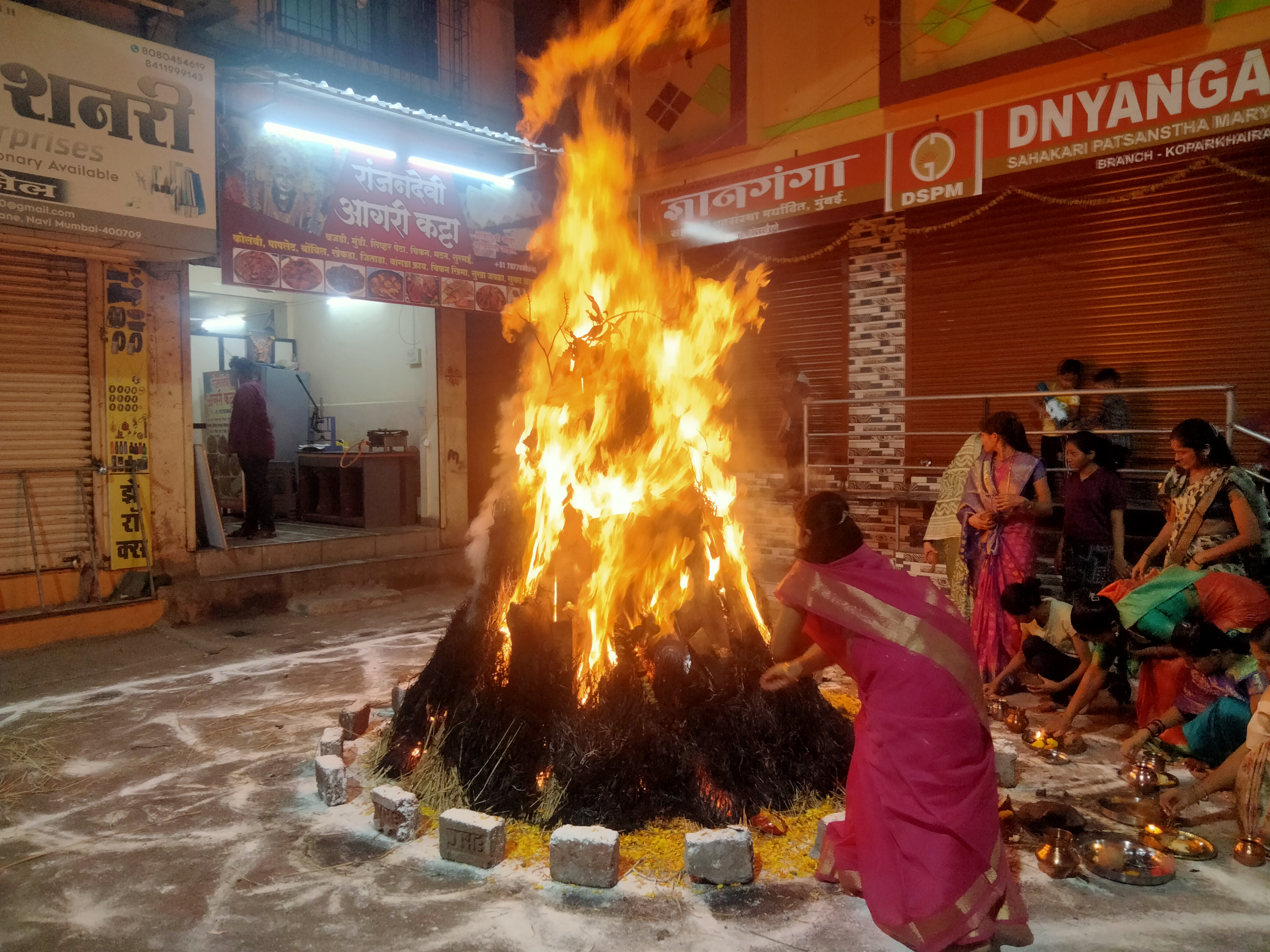
Holika Dahana at Koparkhairane in Navi Mumbai, 2025

In South India, this occasion is called Kama Dahanam, and is associated with the legend of Shiva burning Kamadeva to ashes with his third eye. Pantomimes of Kamadeva are performed on this occasion in rural Tamil Nadu, and his effigies are burnt.

== Significance ==
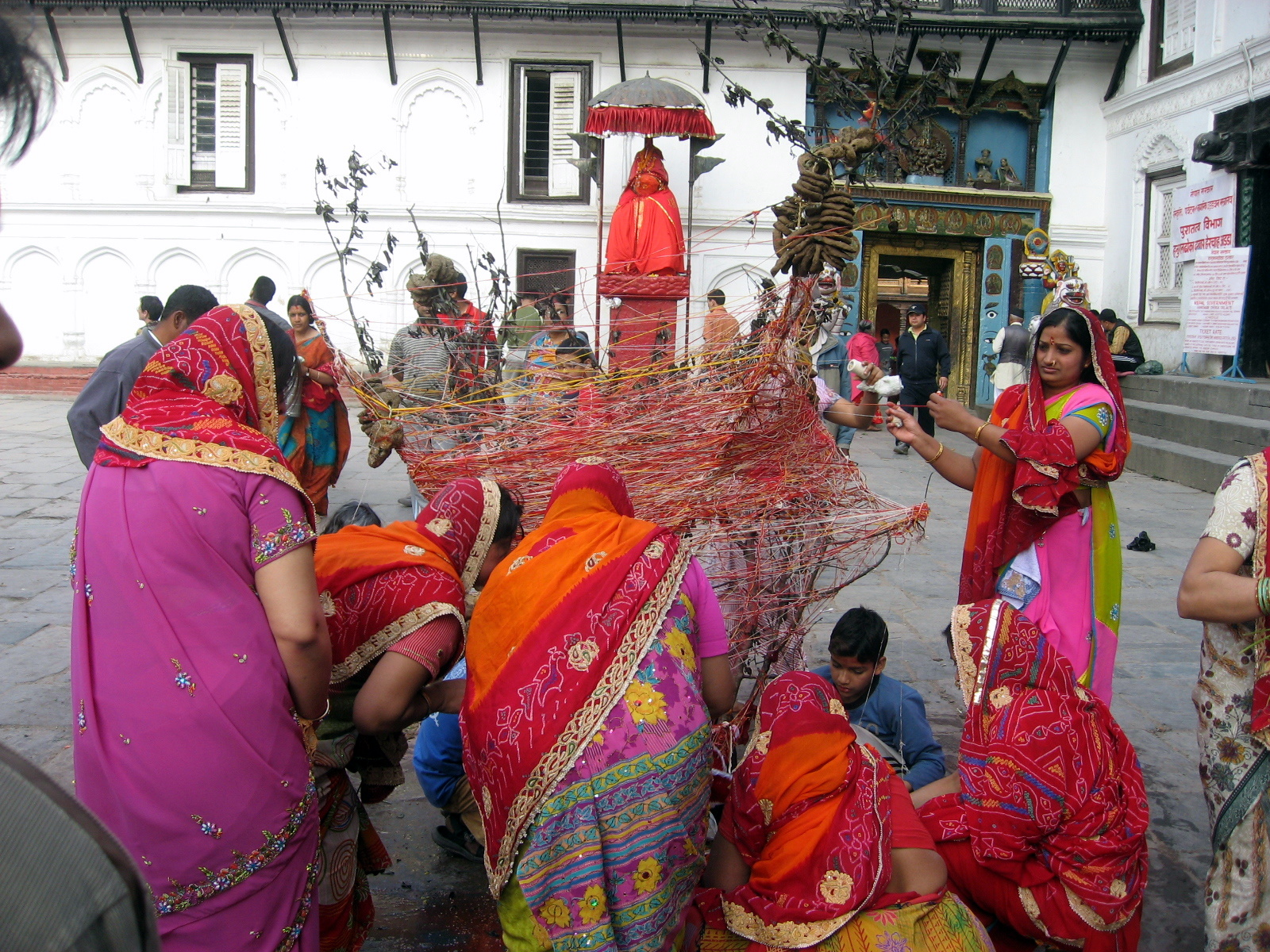
Woman preparing for Holika Dahana, Kathamandu, Nepal

The night before Holi, pyres are burnt in Maharashtra, North India, East India, Assam, Nepal, and parts of South India in keeping with this tradition.

Holika Dahana marks the end of winter and the beginning of spring, a time of renewal and rejuvenation in nature, symbolizing new beginnings and the arrival of a fresh season. The fire is seen as a means of burning away negativity and impurities, both physical and spiritual, preparing individuals for the joy and festivities of Holi. People gather together to participate in the rituals, strengthening social ties and promoting unity within the community.

In some parts of North India, the day is called Holika Dahana, while in other parts like Purvanchal (eastern Uttar Pradesh and western Bihar) as well as Terai regions of Nepal it is called Sammat or Samhat. In West Bengal, the day before Dolyatra is called "Chanchor" or "Nyara Pora", in which dry branches, twigs and leaves of the trees are heaped together and set on fire to commemorate Holika Dahan.

== See also ==
- Shigmo
