= Pappu Yadav =

Indian politician (born 1967)

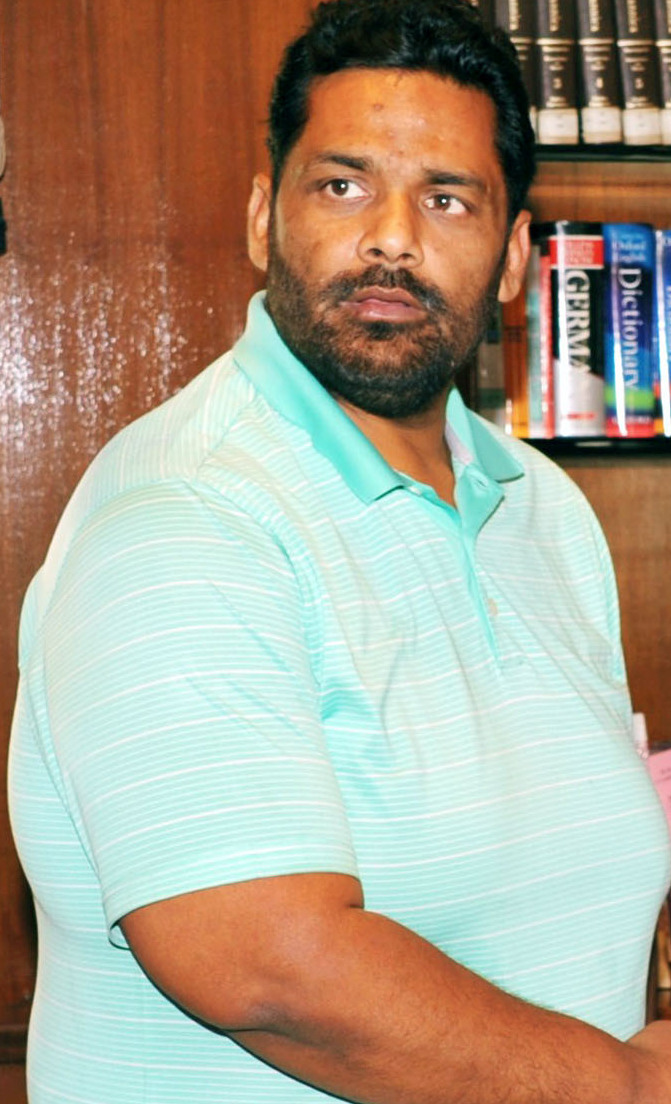

Member of Parliament, Lok Sabha
- Incumbent
- Assumed office 4 June 2024
- Preceded by: Santosh Kumar Kushwaha
- Constituency: Purnia
- In office 16 May 2014 – 23 May 2019
- Preceded by: Sharad Yadav
- Succeeded by: Dinesh Chandra Yadav
- Constituency: Madhepura
- In office 16 May 2004 – 18 May 2009
- Preceded by: Lalu Prasad Yadav
- Succeeded by: Sharad Yadav
- Constituency: Madhepura
- In office 6 October 1999 – 16 May 2004
- Preceded by: Jai Krishna Mandal
- Succeeded by: Uday Singh
- Constituency: Purnea
- In office 15 June 1991 – 4 December 1997
- Preceded by: Mohammed Taslimuddin
- Succeeded by: Jai Krishna Mandal
- Constituency: Purnea

Member of Bihar Legislative Assembly
- In office 1990–1991
- Preceded by: Ramendra Kumar Yadav
- Succeeded by: Bam Bhola Yadav
- Constituency: Singheshwar

President of Jan Adhikar Party (Loktantrik)
- In office 9 May 2015 – 20 March 2024
- Succeeded by: Position abolished

Personal details
- Born: Rajesh Ranjan; 24 December 1967 (age 58) Khurda, Bihar, India
- Party: Indian National Congress (since 2024)
- Other political affiliations: Independent (2024), Jan Adhikar Party (Loktantrik); (2015 – 2024); Rashtriya Janata Dal; (1991 – 2015)
- Spouse: Ranjeet Ranjan (INC)
- Children: Sarthak Ranjan; Prakriti Ranjan
- Education: Bachelor of Arts (B N Mandal University)

Rajesh Ranjan (born 24 December 1967), popularly known as Pappu Yadav, is an Indian politician from Bihar, and a member of Parliament (MP) representing Purnia constituency in Bihar.

Emerging from a background linked to crime, Pappu Yadav transitioned into politics in the 1990s. He has been elected to the Lok Sabha in 1991, 1996, 1999, 2004, 2014 and 2024, representing various constituencies in Bihar either independently or under different party banners including the Samajwadi Party, Lok Janshakti Party, and Rashtriya Janata Dal (RJD), but his electoral success has been largely independent of party affiliations.

In the 2015 Bihar elections he formed his own party, Jan Adhikar Party (Loktantrik) but failed to make any impact and could barely capture any votes. On 20 March 2024, he merged his party with the Indian National Congress (INC).

== Early life ==
Pappu Yadav was born on 24 December 1967 in a zamindar family in Khurda Karveli village (Kumarkhand block), Madhepura district, Bihar. He studied in Anand Marg School at Anand Palli, Supaul. He completed graduation in political science from B. N. Mandal University, Madhepura and a diploma in disaster management and human rights from IGNOU.

Rajesh Ranjan is his official name but nickname Pappu was given by his grandfather in childhood. He is married to Ranjeet Ranjan. She was also an MP from Madhepura but lost to Janata Dal (United) (JDU) in 2019 general election. His son Sarthak Ranjan, is a T-20 cricket player for Delhi.

Yadav's entry into the criminal world was facilitated by his maternal uncle, Arjun Singh, a dominant figure in his district, who used to run a parallel government in the area. Yadav succeeded Singh in his operations and founded the youth organization Yuva Shakti, which allegedly engaged in criminal activities under his leadership.

== Politics ==
Yadav's political journey began with his independent win in the Singheshwar constituency in the 1990 Bihar Legislative Assembly election. He soon garnered the attention of prominent politicians, including RJD chief Lalu Prasad Yadav. In the 1991 Indian general election, Yadav won the Purnia Lok Sabha constituency with a significant margin, solidifying his influence in the Kosi region.

In 2008, Yadav was convicted of murder and sentenced to life imprisonment, which disqualified him from fighting future elections.

=== 2009 Lok Sabha election ===
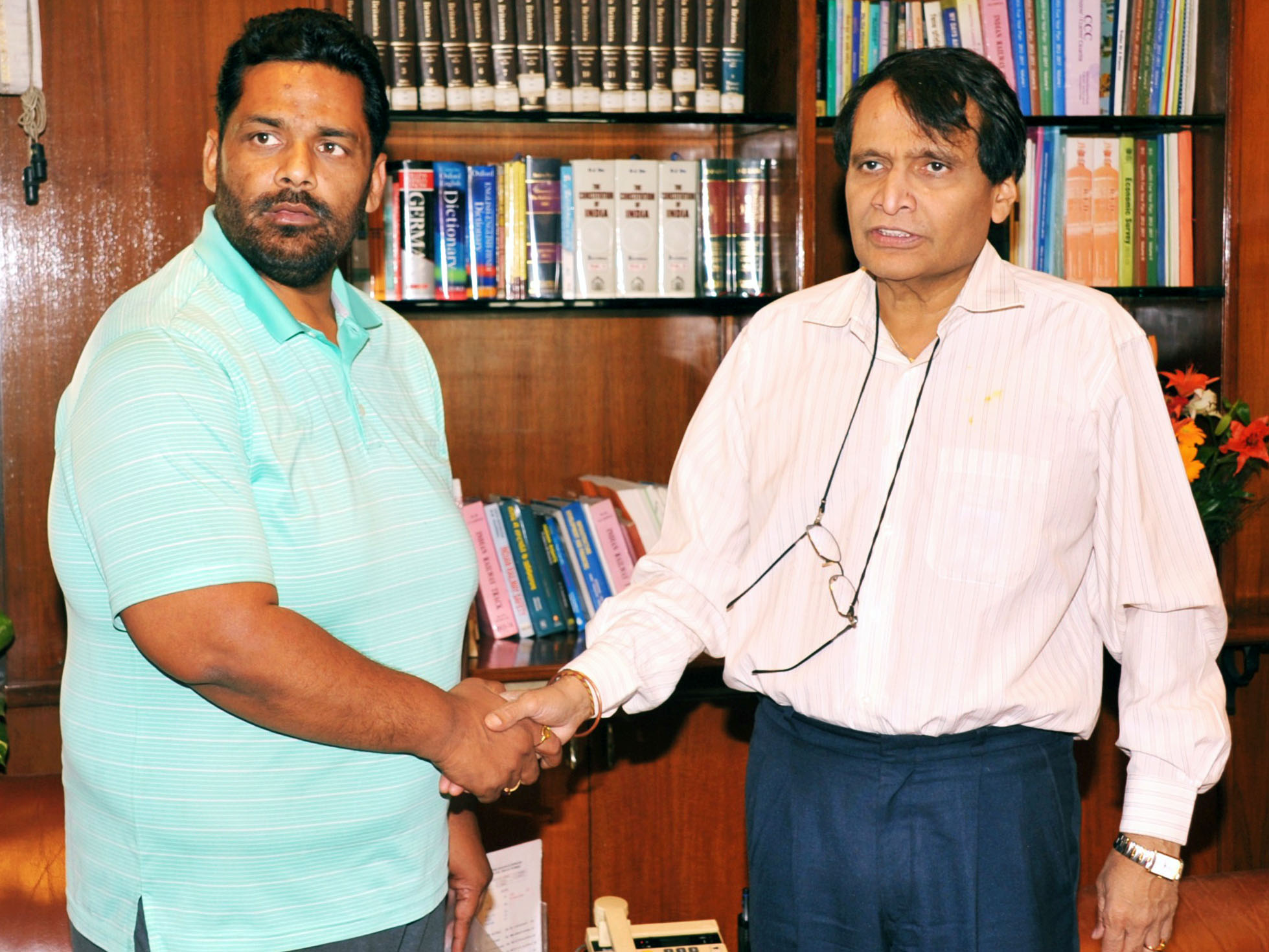
Pappu Yadav meeting the Union Minister for Railways, Suresh Prabhakar Prabhu

On 2 April 2009, the Patna High Court rejected Yadav's plea to be allowed to contest the 2009 Indian parliamentary elections because he had been convicted of murder. On 11 April, RJD chief Lalu Prasad Yadav expelled Pappu Yadav from the party. His mother Shanti Priya fought elections in his place, she lost to Uday Singh of Bharatiya Janata Party (BJP).

=== 2010 Bihar election ===
During 2010 Bihar Legislative Assembly election, Pappu Yadav along with Anil Yadav and Rampravesh Rai were expelled from the RJD for alleged anti-party activity. They were charged with working against the party's official nominee for Fatuha Assembly constituency, Ramanand Yadav.

=== 2014 Lok Sabha election ===
Yadav was acquitted of murder and subsequently fought in the 2014 general elections.

Pappu Yadav defeated JD(U)'S Sharad Yadav and become an MP for the fifth time. His wife, Ranjeet Ranjan was also elected from Supaul from Congress. Pappu Yadav became one of the 'best performing' MPs from Bihar in 2015 for his attendance and participation in debates.

=== 2015 Bihar election ===
On 7 May 2015, the RJD expelled him due to anti-party activities, after which he founded a new party Jan Adhikar Party (Loktantrik).

Pappu Yadav floated the new party just before the 2015 Bihar Legislative Assembly election. He campaigned against the Nitish-Lalu alliance. His party fought on 64 seats as part of Socialist Secular Morcha to form a third front in but failed to win any seats in the 16th Bihar Assembly.

=== 2019 Lok Sabha election ===
Pappu Yadav suffered a defeat in 2019 when he contested from his own party from Madhepura constituency but came third behind Dinesh Chandra Yadav and Sharad Yadav. His wife lost her seat to Dileshwar Kamait after contesting from Congress.

=== 2020 Bihar election ===
In September 2020, prior to the Bihar Assembly elections, Yadav floated a new alliance called People Democratic Alliance which contained parties like Bahujan Mukti Party and Social Democratic Party of India, Indian Union Muslim League along with Azad Samaj Party, the party of Dalit activist and president of Bhim Army, Chandrashekhar Azad Ravan.

=== 2024 Lok Sabha election ===
Pappu Yadav, who contested the Purnia Lok Sabha seat in Bihar as an independent candidate, won the seat by a margin of over 23,000 votes. He defeated JDU candidate Santosh Kushwaha and RJD candidate Bima Bharti.

== Positions held ==
Pappu Yadav was elected as MP, four times from the Purnia and twice from Madhepura constituency.

From	To	Position	Constituency	Party
1990	1991	MLA (1st term)	Singheshwar	Independent
1991	1996	MP (1st term) in 10th Lok Sabha (by-poll)	Purnia	Independent
1996	1998	MP (2nd term) in 11th Lok Sabha	Purnia	SP
1999	2004	MP (3rd term) in 13th Lok Sabha	Purnia	Independent
2004	2009	MP (4th term) in 14th Lok Sabha (by-poll)	Madhepura	RJD
2014	2019	MP (5th term) in 16th Lok Sabha	Madhepura	RJD
2024	2029	MP (6th term) in 18th Lok Sabha	Purnia	Independent

== Controversies ==
He was allegedly involved in aiding Kim Davy, the prime accused in the Purulia arms drop case, in evading Indian authorities in 1995 during his tenure as an independent MP.

In 2008, Pappu Yadav was convicted by a special court in Ajit Sarkar murder case of 1998 and sentenced to life imprisonment. He was involved in various controversies while in imprisonment, like holding audiences and having unrestricted access to cellphones. He was acquitted in 2013 by the Patna High Court. Central Bureau of Investigation (CBI) has filed an appeal challenging his arrest in the Supreme Court.

In his autobiography Drohkaal ka Pathik, released in November 2013, Pappu Yadav has alleged that three MPs of Indian Federal Democratic Party got money from the then finance minister Yashwant Sinha, to join the NDA in 2001. He has also claimed that during the July 2008 trust vote, both the Congress and BJP had offered "Rs 40 crore each" to MPs for their support.

In 2015 he was once again in controversy after being reported to have allegedly threatened to hit a Jet Airways airhostess with slippers.

In June 2020, Pappu Yadav and his supporters defaced advertisements and billboards of Chinese companies on the streets of Patna, after the Galwan clash.

In May 2021, Pappu Yadav was arrested in a 32 year old kidnapping case and for flouting COVID-19 norms. Pappu Yadav has alleged political vendetta as he was raising questions against government expenditures in ambulance management during COVID-19.

As per 2019 election affidavit, Pappu Yadav has 31 pending cases against him. This number shot up to 41 in 2024.

On 12 April 2023, he was convicted under Section 147 and 353 of the Indian Penal Code (IPC) a special MP/MLA court in Patna. On 24 November 2023, he was convicted under IPC Section 414 by the same court. Yadav has filed an appeal for both the cases.

== See also ==
- Mafia Raj
