= Holika =

Asuri in Hindu mythology

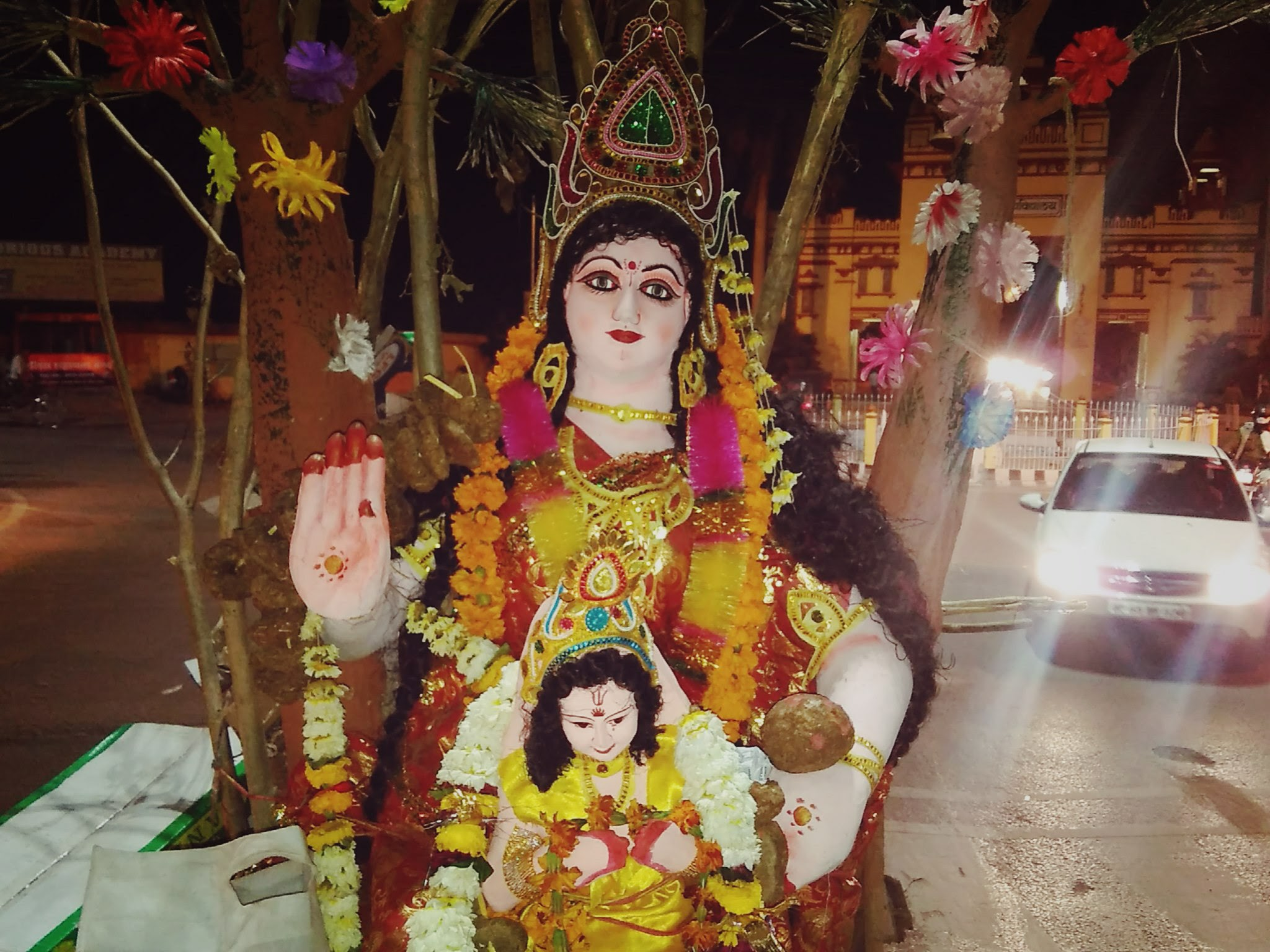
A figurine of Holika for Holika Dahan

Holika (Sanskrit: होलिका, IAST: Holikā) is an asuri in Hinduism. She is the sister of the asura-kings Hiranyakashipu and Hiranyaksha, and the paternal aunt of Prahlada.

According to Hindu tradition, the legend of Holika Dahan (the burning of Holika) symbolizes the victory of good over evil. Holika is associated with the annual bonfire on the night before Holi, the festival of colours.

== Legend ==
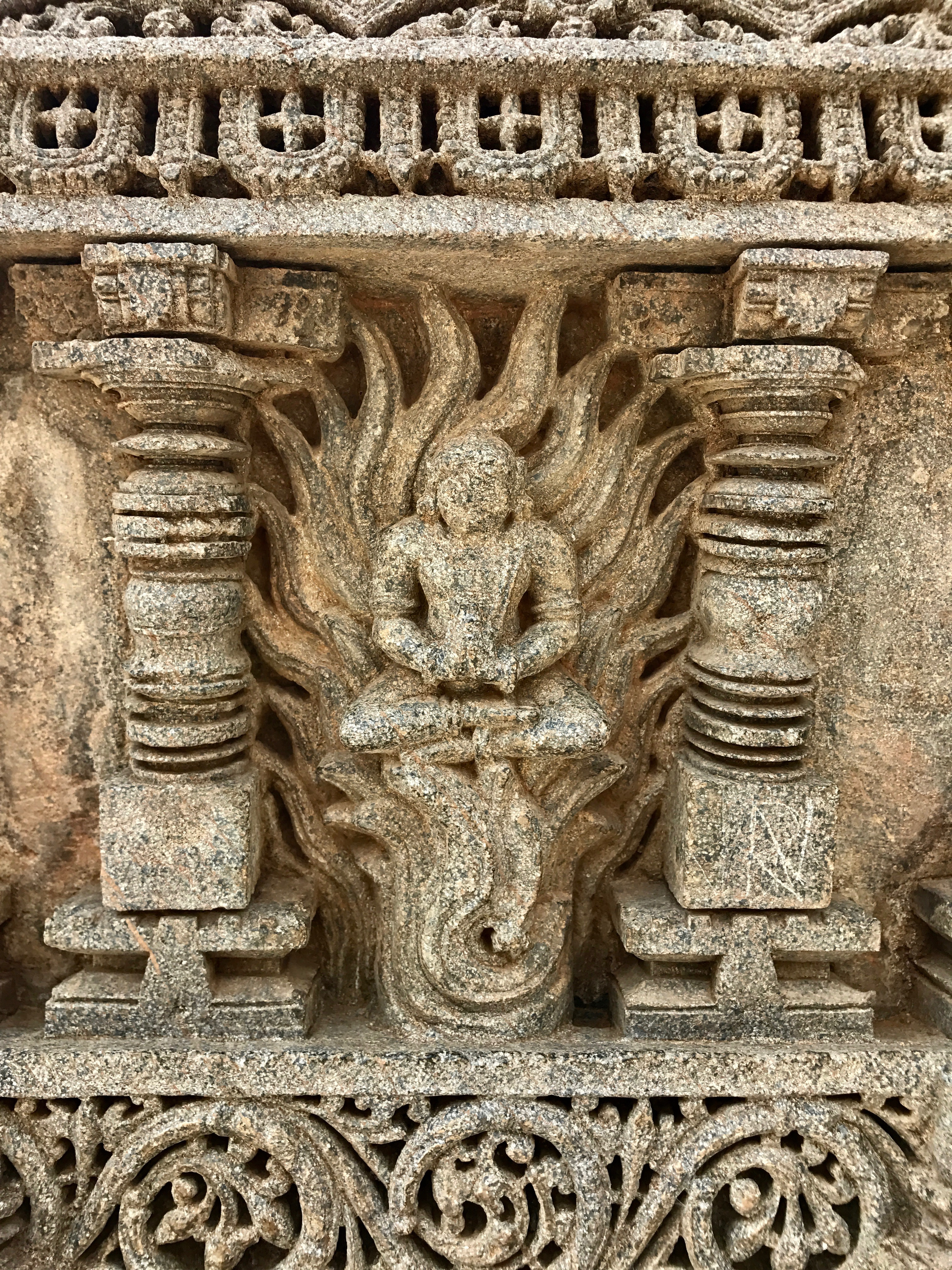
Ancient sculpture depicting Prahlada in flames.

According to the Puranas, a king named Hiranyakashipu, like many asuras, wished to become immortal. To fulfill this desire, he performed the required tapas (austerities) until Brahma granted him a boon. Hiranyakashipu received five wishes: that he would not perish inside or outside, by day or night, by any weapon, on earth or in the sky, by men or beasts, or by devas or asuras; that he would be unequalled; that he would possess undiminishing power; and that he would be the sole ruler of all creation. His wish was granted and Hiranyakashipu conquered the three worlds, assuming the throne of Indra. He punished and killed all who objected to his supremacy. His son Prahlada, however, had been raised as a Vaishnava and refused to worship his father as a deity.

This infuriated Hiranyakashipu, and he made various attempts to kill Prahlada. During one attempt on Prahlada's life, King Hiranyakashipu's sister, Holika, offered her help. According to the Vishnu Purana, Holika told her brother that, due to a boon she had received, she was invulnerable to fire. Arrangements were made for Prahlada to sit upon his aunt's lap atop a burning pyre. However, as Prahlada chanted the name of Vishnu, he escaped unscathed while Holika was incinerated.

In a variation of this Puranic legend, Hiranyakashipu had Holika wear her scarf or her fireproof garment, so that his son would perish while she remained protected atop the pyre. Yet as the fire intensified, the garment flew off Holika and covered Prahlada. Holika burnt to death, and Prahlada emerged unharmed.

Vishnu then appeared in the form of Narasimha (a half-human and half-lion avatar not created by Brahma), at dusk (neither day nor night). He took Hiranyakashipu to the threshold of his dwelling (neither indoors nor outdoors), placed him upon his lap (neither land, water, nor air), and slew the king with his claws (not a weapon). In this manner, the comprehensive boon of Hiranyakashipu was rendered useless. Prahlada and the beings of the three worlds were thus freed from the tyrant's rule, and cosmic order was restored.

== Holika Dahan ==
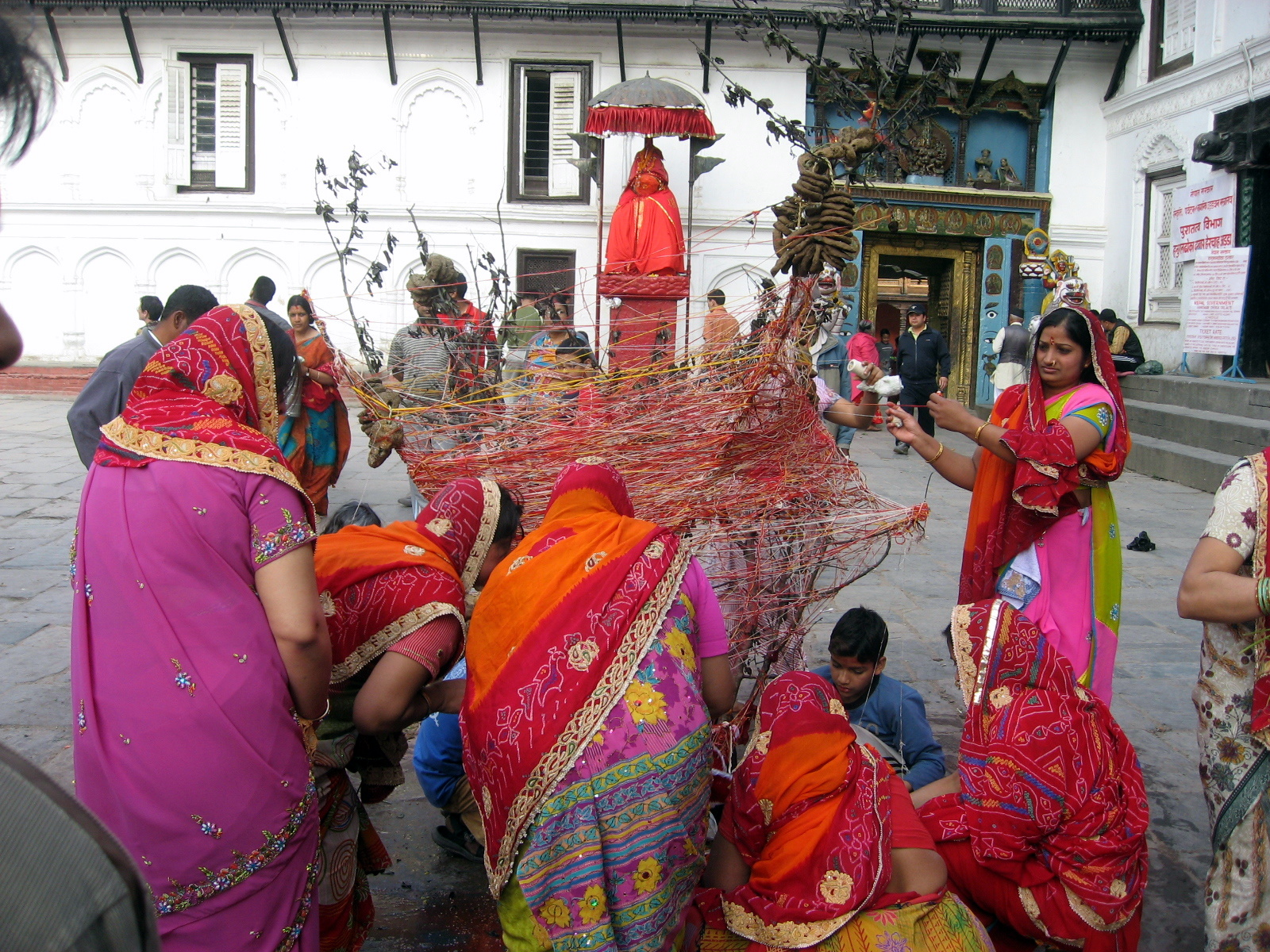
Holika Dahan, Kathamandu, Nepal

Holika Dahan is the ceremonial act of lighting a bonfire to celebrate the death of Holika and salvation of Prahlada. Various rituals accompany this ceremony that differ across regions in India, including circumambulating the fire and offering various items such as coconuts, barley, wheat and cow dung into the fire. The night before Holi, pyres are burnt in North India, to commemorate this legend. This date coincides with the festival of Kama Dahanam in South India, regarded as the date Shiva burnt Kamadeva to ashes.

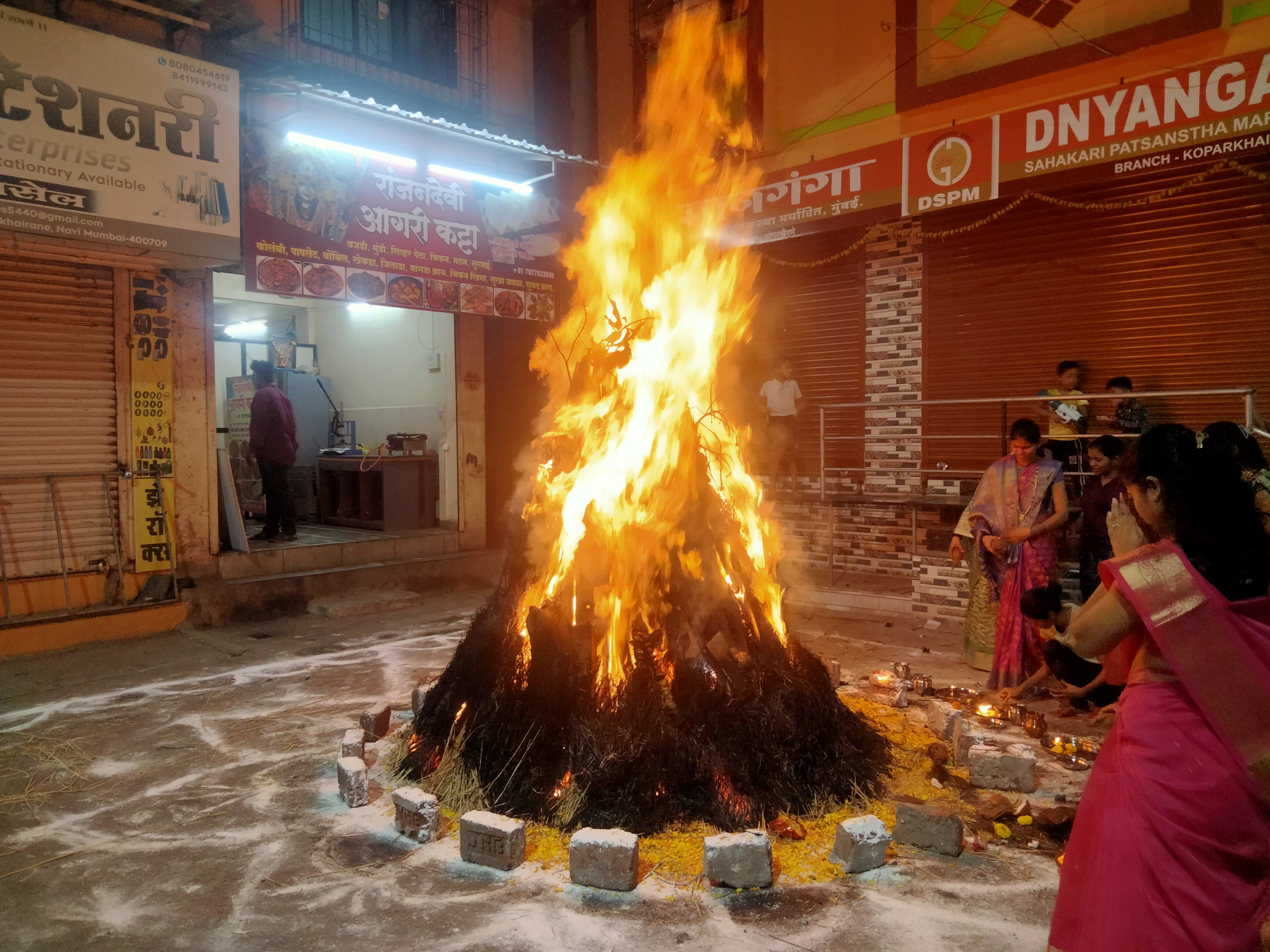
View of the Holika Dahan at Koparkhairane in Navi Mumbai (2025)
