= Dagarua, Bihar =

Dagarua Dagarwa
- Town
- Location in Bihar, India
- Coordinates: 25.80°N 87.64°E
- Country: India
- State: Bihar
- Region: Mithila
- District: Purnia
- Established: 1994(As a Block)

Population (2001)
  - Total: 221,229

Languages
  - Official: Hindi, Urdu
  - Regional: Maithili, Surjapuri
- Time zone: UTC+5:30 (IST)
- Postal code: 854326
- Lok Sabha constituency: Purnia
- Vidhan Sabha constituency: Baisi

Dagarua (Dagarwa) is a town and a notified area in Purnia district (Purnea) in the Indian state of Bihar. It is a block and village panchayat located near NH 31 in Purnia. It is situated 15 km East of Purnia City. It consists of one police station. It has a total population of 2,21,229 in which male are 1,14,933 and female population of 1,06,296 and children (0-6 yrs) is 45,940. It has a literacy rate of 37.39%. It has sex-ratio of 48 out of 52 males.

== Dagarua block ==
There are eighteen Panchayats in Dagarua Block. It consists of the following:

Adhkaili	Dariapur	Rampur
Belgachhi	Duweli	Harkheli
Bhabhni	Echali	Teghra
Buari	Kohila	Thathol
Chapi	Majgama	Mahthor
Dagarua	Makeli	Toli

There are 140 villages under Dagarua Block.

== Dagarua Panchayat ==
Dagarua, Soti, Ladhua, Patringa, Lokani and Uadharna are the villages that come under Dagarua Panchayat.

== Geography ==
Dagarua is situated beside NH 31 road which is a main lane to connect Purnia to Siliguri (West Bengal). It is situated 15 km EAST from Purnia and 150 km WEST from Siliguri. Nearby cities are Purnia, Katihar, Kishanganj, and Araria. Purnia Junction Railway Station is very near to Dagarua. This railway station connects the main railway stations like Katihar, Jogbani and Saharsa so that people go to other places conveniently through this route. A large number of people are dependent on agriculture.

== Demography ==
Maithili, Hindi & Urdu are the languages spoken by here people. As per 2001 census, Dagarua had a total population of 2,21,229 in which male are 1,14,933 and female population of 1,06,296 and children (0-6 yrs) is 45,940. It has a literacy rate of 37.39%. It has sex-ratio of 48 out of 52 males. Baisi is the Vidhan Sabha constituency which is very near to Dagarua.

== Religious Organisations ==
The Islamic Ijtema, a religious conference is organised in Dagarua by Muslims and Hindus. It is known as Dagarua Ijtema. It plays a significant role on the lives of Muslims and a huge number of people engage in Ijtema. This conference held peacefully.
