= Saba Zafar =

Indian politician

Member of the Legislative Assembly Bihar
- In office 2010–2015
- Preceded by: Abdul Jalil Mastan
- Succeeded by: Abdul Jalil Mastan
- Constituency: Amour

Personal details
- Born: 12 January 1973 (age 53) Purnia district, Bihar
- Party: Janata Dal (United)
- Other political affiliations: Bharatiya Janata Party
- Occupation: Politician

Saba Zafar is an Indian Politician From Janata Dal (United). He was elected to the assembly in 2010 from Amour (Vidhan Sabha constituency), which is part of Kishanganj (Lok Sabha constituency) after delimitation. Saba Zafar is contested election on BJP ticket from Amour (Vidhan Sabha constituency) in 2015 Bihar Legislative Assembly election. He Joined Janata Dal (United) For 2020 Bihar Polls

Saba Zafar is a Kulahia Muslim. He did his graduation from Patna University. Saba defeated Abdul Jalil Mastan (Surjapuri Muslim) of Congress by over 18,000 votes in Amour in 2010 Bihar Legislative Assembly election.
