= Banbhag, Bihar =

jhunni istambrar Bihar
- village
- Location in Bihar, India jhunni istambrar Bihar (India)
- Coordinates: 25.797500°N 87.437230°E
- Country: India
- State: Bihar
- District: Purnia

Languages
  - Official: Hindi, Urdu
- Time zone: UTC+5:30 (IST)
- Vehicle registration: BR-

jhunni istambrar is an Indian Village in Purnia District of Bihar state.
