= Syed Ruknuddin Ahmad =

Indian politician

Member of the Bihar Legislative Assembly
- In office 2020–2025
- Preceded by: Abdus Subhan
- Succeeded by: Ghulam Sarwar
- Constituency: Baisi
- In office October 2005 – 2010
- Preceded by: Abdus Subhan
- Succeeded by: Santosh Kumar Kushwaha
- Constituency: Baisi

Personal details
- Born: 7 December 1976 (age 49) Baisi, Purnea, Bihar
- Party: Rashtriya Janata Dal (2022–Present)
- Other political affiliations: All India Majlis-e-Ittehadul Muslimeen (till 2022)
- Parent: Syed Moinuddin Ahmad (father)
- Occupation: Politician

Syed Ruknuddin Ahmad (born 7 December 1976) is an Indian politician and member of Bihar Legislative Assembly from the Baisi Assembly constituency since 2020. He previously represented the Baisi Assembly constituency from October 2005 to 2010. He won in 2020 being elected a member of All India Majlis-e-Ittehadul Muslimeen. He later joined Rashtriya Janata Dal with three other Members of Legislative Assembly in 2022.

== Early life and education ==
Syed Ruknuddin Ahmad was born to former Member of Legislative Assembly from Baisi Assembly constituency Syed Moinuddin Ahmad on 7 December 1976 at Baisi, Purnia district of Bihar.

He completed his Intermediate from RPS College, Patna in year 1994.
