= Dhamdaha (community development block) =

Block of Purnia District, Bihar, India

- Block
- Location within Bihar Location within India
- Coordinates: 25°48′57″N 87°10′29″E
- Country: India
- State: Bihar
- Region: Mithila
- District: Purnia
- Villages: 72

Area
  - Total: 345.55 km^{2} (133.42 sq mi)
- Elevation: 39 m (128 ft)

Population (2011)
  - Total: 288,084
  - Density: 833.70/km^{2} (2,159.3/sq mi)
- Time zone: UTC+5:30 (IST)

Dhamdaha is a block of Purnia District, Bihar, India. Its seat of government is located in the village of Dhamdaha. In 2011, the block has a total population of 288,084.

== Geography ==
Dhamdaha is located on the western portion of Purnia District. Its average elevation is at 39 metres above the sea level.

== Administrative divisions ==
Dhamdaha has the 72 following villages under its administration:

- Aurahi
- Bansipurandaha
- Bansipurandaha Milik
- Bardela
- Barkona
- Barkona Milik
- Bela Champawati
- Bela Gobind
- Bhawani Chak
- Bhutia
- Bishunpur Milik
- Bishunpur Milik
- Bishunpur Milik
- Bishunpur Patti
- Champawati
- Champawati Milik
- Chandrahi
- Chikni
- Dakaiha
- Damaili
- Damgari
- Dhamdaha
- Dharbia
- Dumaria
- Dumaria Chakla
- Gandharap
- Garail Milik
- Halapur
- Hanumani Chakla
- Harpur
- Hemai Patti
- Hemai Patti urf. Kukraun
- Itahari
- Kajra
- Khanua
- Kishunpur Balua
- Kishunpur Balua
- Kishunpur Balua Milik
- Kishunpur Balua Milik
- Kuari
- Kuari
- Kukraun
- Kukraun
- Kukraun Milik
- Madhonagar
- Majhua Fatehganj
- Mali
- Miliki
- Milki
- Mir Milik
- Mir Milik
- Mogalia Purandaha
- Mogalia Purandaha Milik
- Nirpur
- Parasbani
- Phulkahi
- Pirankar
- Rajghat Grarail
- Rampur Chakla
- Rangpura
- Rupaspur Khagha
- Sarsi Istamrar
- Sasri Istamrar Milik
- Satmi
- Sihuli
- Singhara Patti
- Sukhsena
- Sukhsena Milik
- Tarauni Milik
- Thari
- Turki Khagha
- Utna

== Demographics ==
Religion in Dhamdaha
Religion	Percent
Hinduism	84.32%
Islam	14.55%
Christianity	0.26%
other	0.88%

As of 2011, there are 55,911 households and 288,084 residents in Dhamdaha Block. Out of the total population, 150,332 are males and 137,752 are females. The total literacy rate is 43.17%, with 49.97% of the male population and 35.97% of the female population being literate.

== See also ==
- Purnia district
