= Purnia division =

Administrative division in Bihar, India

Purnia Division
- Administrative Division
- Location of Purnia division in Bihar
- Coordinates: 25.78°N 87.47°E
- Country: India
- State: Bihar
- Region: Mithila(Kosi—Seemanchal subregion)
- Established: 1990
- Headquarters: Purnia
- Districts: Araria, Katihar, Kishanganj and Purnia

Area
  - Total: 10,009 km^{2} (3,864 sq mi)
  - Rank: 4th in Bihar

Population (2011)
  - Total: 10,837,617
  - Rank: 4th in Bihar
  - Density: 1,082.8/km^{2} (2,804.4/sq mi)

Purnia division (also known as: Seemanchal) is an administrative geographical unit of Bihar state of India. Purnia is the division's administrative headquarters. The division consists of Purnia district, Katihar district, Araria district, and Kishanganj district. It was established in 1990. It is a part of the Kosi-Seemanchal subregion of the cultural Mithila region.

== History ==
Purnia division, all of which was previously part of Purnia district, is part of the Mithila region. Mithila first gained prominence after being settled by Indo-Aryan peoples who established the Mithila Kingdom (also called Kingdom of the Videhas). During the late Vedic period (c. 1100–500 BCE), Kingdom of the Videhas became one of the major political and cultural centres of Asia, along with Kuru and Pañcāla. The kings of the Kingdom of the Videhas were called Janakas. The Mithila Kingdom was later incorporated into the Vajjika League, which had its capital in the city of Vaishali, which is also in Mithila.

During the Mughal rule, Purnia was an outlying military province, and its revenue was mostly spent on protecting its borders against tribes from the north and east. After the capture of Calcutta in 1757, Purnia's local governor raised a rebellion against Siraj ud-Daulah. In 1765, the district became a British possession, along with the rest of Bengal. On February tenth, 1770 The district of Purnia in modern history was formed by the East India Company. Purnia district has seen the three districts partitioned off from its territory: Katihar in 1976, and Araria and Kishanganj in 1990. The districts of Araria, Katihar, Purnia and Kishanganj together from the Purnia division.

Seemanchal (border area) is a colloquial alternate term for Purnia division owing to its close proximity with the Bangladesh–India border, although the state of Bihar itself does not share any international borders with Bangladesh. The term gained popularity after the veteran RJD leader Mohammed Taslimuddin first proposed the creation of a separate Seemanchal state in 1992, during a period when he was a Member of Parliament representing Purnia on a Janata Dal ticket. The proposal included the districts of Kishanganj, Purnia, Araria, Katihar, and sometimes Bhagalpur, Supaul, and Khagaria. The demand was based on Seemanchal’s distinct demography (high Muslim population) and overall socioeconomic backwardness of the region.

=== English rule and freedom struggle ===
The last of the Governors was Md. Ali Khan who was replaced in 1770 by Ducarrel, the first English supervisor or Collector. The early years of British rule were years of trouble for Purnia. The district suffered terribly during the great famine of 1770. From the old records, it appears that there were European settlers in Purnia almost immediately after the establishment of British rule in the district. By 1771, a number of Europeans had settled in the area known as Rambagh, the only building left in Rambagh was the church and the priests' houses. The Roman Catholic Church was dismantled and re-erected in the new station of Purnia where the Europeans had already set up their residences. The foundation of this new church was there until 1934, when it was badly affected by the Bihar earthquake. The church was dismantled again. The nuns of Loretto convent of Darjeeling had come to Purnia near about 1882 and had opened a day school as well as a boarding school for children in Purnia district. When the Jesuit Mission of Bengal took over the Purnia Mission from the Capuchin Mission, the school was closed and the nuns returned to Darjeeling. This house still stands and is known as the Coumblin. It is one of the oldest houses in Purnia town and is now occupied by the Allisons.

Kisan Sabha movement, which had been responsible for an acute agitation in Purnia district in the third decade in 20th century and figured prominently for about 20 years, had its roots in the very agricultural economy and the precious structure of permanent land-lordism in this state. The Kisan Sabha was formed at Munger near about 1922–23. After 1940–41, the kisan sabha movement slowly merged into the Congress Movement.

Purnia district, being so very contiguous to several districts of undivided Bengal, had been promptly affected by the swadeshi movement in the first decade of the 20th century. At that time there were no facilities for higher education in Purnia district and the students who sought higher education had to go to Calcutta or to Patna. The Bihar National College and TK Ghosh Academy were suspected as the two centres for a secret students organisation, which indulged in sedition and both these institutions had a sprinkling of students from Purnia. A boy from Purnia, Atul Chandra Mazumdar, a student of the BN College, Patna was arrested under the Defence Act of India.

Since 1919, Purnia had closely followed the policy, aims and objectives of the Indian National Congress. Some of the delegates of Purnia attended the Nagpur session of Congress in 1920 and the moment Mahatma Gandhi gave the call for the Non-Cooperation, there were a number of volunteers in this district. Some of the early local leaders were Gokul Krishna Roy, Satyendra Narayan Roy and a few others who gave up their practice in the Bar and joined the movement.

In 1921, a national school was started in Katihar. Rajendra Prasad toured Purnia district in 1921 and addressed meetings at Purnia and at other places. In 1942 Quit India Movement tactics were fully implemented by the people of Purnia. Mahatma Gandhi visited Purnia in 1929, during which time he met the Raja of Nazargunj and addressed crowded meetings at various places including Kisahnganj, Bishnupur, Araria and Purnia. The survey and settlement operations in Purnia district commenced in 1952 and settlement operations were concluded in 1960. During the 1911–20 period, Purnia suffered from epidemics of cholera every year from 1915 to 1919. A very serious outbreak of cholera occurred in 1925. Incidences of smallpox and malaria was very high during this period.

Since Independence, the region has suffered from significant neglect from successive governments.

== Demographics ==
=== Religion ===
Religion in Purnia Division (Seemanchal)
Hindus	53.51%
Muslims	45.93%
Others	0.56%

District	Hindu	Muslim	Other
Purnia	60.94	38.46	0.60
Kishanganj	31.43	67.98	0.59
Katihar	54.85	44.47	0.68
Araria	56.68	42.95	0.37

=== Language ===
Languages in Purnia Division (2011)
1. Hindi (23.6%)
2. Urdu (20.7%)
3. 'Other' Hindi (17.2%)
4. Surjapuri (17.1%)
5. Maithili (9.14%)
6. Bengali (6.37%)
7. Santali (2.42%)
8. Bhojpuri (1.21%)
9. Others (2.19%)

According to the 2011 census, Purnia division has a population of 1,08,37,617 which is 10.41% of the population of Bihar. Maithili is the native language of this area. Hindi is the language of the majority according to the 2011 census, followed by Urdu, Surjapuri, Bengali, Maithili, Santali and Bhojpuri.

The religious demographics of Purnia division are very different from the rest of Bihar. Although in Bihar the overall Muslim population is 16.86%, in Purnia division the Muslim population is 45.93% while the Hindu population is 53.51%.

== Government and politics ==
=== List of subdivisions in Purnia Division ===
Districts	Subdivisions
Araria	Araria
Araria	Forbesganj
Katihar	Katihar
Katihar	Barsoi
Katihar	Manihari
Kishanganj	Kishanganj
Purnia	Purnia
Purnia	Banmankhi
Purnia	Baisi
Purnia	Dhamdaha

== 2017 North Bihar Floods ==
2017 Floods affected 19 districts of North Bihar causing death of 514 people, in which four districts of Purnia division (Araria 87, Katihar 40, Kishanganj 24 and Purnia 9) accounted for 160 deaths alone.
