= Manihari =

- Town
- Location in Bihar, India
- Coordinates: 25.35°N 87.63°E
- Country: India
- State: Bihar
- Region: Seemanchal
- District: Katihar
- Elevation: 31 m (102 ft)

Population (2011)
  - Total: 26,629

Language
  - Official: Hindi
  - Additional official: Urdu
  - Regional: Angika
- Time zone: UTC+5:30 (IST)
- PIN: 854113
- Lok Sabha constituency: Katihar
- Vidhan Sabha constituency: Manihari
- Website: katihar.bih.nic.in

Manihari is a town and a notified area in Katihar district in the Indian state of Bihar. Pincode of Manihari is 854113. Manihari is a town in Katihar district in the Indian state of Bihar. Manihari, the Kashi of Mithila, Seemanchal and the North-Eastern states - Situated on the banks of the national river Maa Ganga, Manihari town is the last town in India which is like Kashi for the Hindu and Buddhist pilgrims of the entire Mithila, Seemanchal and the North-Eastern states as well as China, Tibet, present-day Bangladesh, Bhutan, Nepal and Myanmar, from where once trains like the North East Queen Express used to run till Guwahati!

While referring to Maghi Purnima cum Ganga bath, the then Bengal surveyor Mr. Francis Buchanan writes in the Purnia District Gazette of 1810-11 that a crowd of about 4 lakh devotees had gathered at Manihari Ganga Ghat that year, which is a self-evident proof of the importance and historicity of Manihari Ganga Ghat, whereas Manihari Railway started in 1887 and there were no paved roads at that time. Where Gogabeel Community Bird Sanctuary cum Gokhur Lake is a famous tourist destination. In this National River Route 1, there is also a sanctuary for the national aquatic animal dolphin or son from Bhagalpur to Manihari.

The travel route of the 7th-century Chinese Buddhist pilgrim Xuanzang passed through Manihari Ganga Ghat during his travels to Kamarupa. Historic and religious sites in the area include the Ardhanarishwar Gauri Shankar Temple, the medieval Haj Ghar Shahi Mosque, Peer Pahad, Neelha Kothi, and the Santmat Satsang Kuti, established in 1936 as the site associated with the enlightenment of Maharshi Mehi Paramhans. In 1756, the nearby area of Baldiabadi was the location of a battle between Shaukat Jung, the Nawab of Purnia, and Siraj-ud-Daulah, the Nawab of Bengal. Infrastructure built during the British colonial period includes a health centre built in 1900, Police Station 333, and the Manihari railway station built in 1887. The town is connected via the Janaki Express rail service. Geographically, the area features loamy soil and an exposure of the Rajmahal Hills along the Ganges River, visible during low-water months from January to June. Educational and historic institutions include the Bethel Mission School, supported by a Norwegian organization, and local sites associated with the Indian independence movement. Namami Gange

Manihari is an ancient and historical city for religious, economic and natural tourism along with Indian culture. It is the nearest meeting point of three states like Bihar, Jharkhand and West Bengal as well as countries like India, Nepal, Bhutan, Bangladesh, China, Tibet and Myanmar. It is connected to all these countries by river and sea route. Ganga Aarti is also performed here regularly. Excellent films like Teesri Kasam and Bandini have been related to Manihari Ganga Ghat.

== Geography ==
Manihari is located at 25.35°N 87.63°E. It has an average elevation of 31 m (101 feet). This place is well known for the Manihari ghat, which connects it to Sakrigali Ghaat, which is situated on the southern bank of the River Ganges.

The town is located on the northern bank of the river Ganges where it meets the river Koshi, thus making the town prone to flooding every year. Manihari is a small border town between the states of Bihar and Jharkhand. Sahebganj is the district town of Jharkhand which is 9 km from Manihari (nautical mile distance); there is regular ferry service. Chief Minister Nitish Kumar flagged off the first passenger train on the newly converted Broad gauge (BG) section of Katihar-Manihari in Katihar division of North-East Frontier Railway (NFR) at Katihar station. There are few local trains which run between Manihari and Katihar.

The geography of Manihari is unique. The river Ganges (i.e. Ganga) flows eastward up to Manihari and takes a southward turn after Manihari. Thus, Manihari is known as the point of River Ganges's sharp bend leading its eastward water flow to turn to southward water flow.

=== Manihari Ghat ===
Before the Farakka Barrage over the Ganges was constructed, people going to the Darjeeling Hills or North Bengal from Kolkata, used to travel by broad gauge train to Sakrigali Ghat and then cross the Ganges by steamer. On the other side of the river at Manihari Ghat, they used to take a metre gauge train to Siliguri. Once Farakka Barrage became operational in 1975 (the barrage has a broad gauge rail line on it), this route became redundant. There still is a ferry service linking Manihari Ghat with Sahebganj.

== Demographics ==
As of 2001 India census, Manihari had a population of 21,783. Males constitute 53% of the population and females 47%. Manihari has an average literacy rate of 44%, lower than the national average of 59.5%: male literacy is 52%, and female literacy is 35%. In Manihari, 19% of the population is under 6 years of age.

As of 2011 India census, Manihari had a population of 26,629.
