= Abdul Jalil Mastan =

Indian politician (1955/1956–2026)

Registration, Excise and Prohibition Government of Bihar
- In office 20 November 2015 – 16 July 2017
- Chief Minister: Nitish Kumar
- Deputy Chief Minister: Tejashwi Yadav

Member of Bihar Legislative Assembly
- In office 2015–2020
- Preceded by: Saba Zafar
- Succeeded by: Akhtarul Iman
- Constituency: Amour
- In office 2000–2010
- In office 1985–1995

Personal details
- Born: 1955 or 1956
- Died: 12 September 2026 (aged 70) New Delhi, India
- Party: Indian National Congress

Abdul Jalil Mastan (1955 or 1956 – 12 September 2026) was an Indian politician. In the 2015 Bihar Legislative Assembly election, he was elected minister of Registration, Excise and Prohibition in Fifth Nitish Kumar ministry as a member of the Indian National Congress party. Mastan was one of the senior leaders of the Indian National Congress, and was elected six times since 1985 to the Bihar Legislative Assembly to represent the Amour Assembly constituency. He had strong hold in the Kosi-Seemanchal region of Bihar. In the 2020 Bihar Legislative Assembly election, Mastan was defeated by State President of AIMIM Bihar, Akhtarul Iman.

Mastan died on 12 September 2026, at the age of 70.
