= Baisi Assembly constituency =

Coordinates: 25°49′49″N 87°44′05″E

Baisi
- Constituency No. - for the Bihar Legislative Assembly

Constituency details
- Country: India
- Region: East India
- State: Bihar
- District: Purnia
- Established: 1951
- Total electors: 286,869
- Reservation: None

Member of Legislative Assembly
- 18th Bihar Legislative Assembly
- Incumbent Ghulam Sarwar
- Party: AIMIM
- Alliance: None
- Elected year: 2025
- Preceded by: Syed Ruknuddin Ahmad

Baisi Assembly constituency is an assembly constituency in Purnea district in the Indian state of Bihar.

== Overview ==
As per Delimitation of Parliamentary and Assembly constituencies Order, 2008, No 57 Baisi Assembly constituency is composed of the following: Baisi and Dagarua community development blocks.

Baisi Assembly constituency is part of No 10 Kishanganj Lok Sabha constituency.

== Members of the Legislative Assembly ==
Year	Name	Party
1952	Abul Ahmad Mohammad Noor	Indian National Congress
1957	Abul Ahmad Mohammad Noor	Indian National Congress
1962	Haseebur Rahman	Praja Socialist Party
1977	Haseebur Rahman	Indian National Congress
1980	Syed Moinuddin Ahmad	Independent
1985	Abdus Subhan	Lokdal
1990	Abdus Subhan	Janata Dal
1995	Syed Moinuddin Ahmad	Indian National Congress
2000	Abdus Subhan	Rashtriya Janata Dal
2005	Abdus Subhan	Rashtriya Janata Dal
2005	Syed Ruknuddin Ahmad	Independent
2010	Santosh Kushwaha	Bharatiya Janata Party
2014^	Abdus Subhan	Rashtriya Janata Dal
2015	Abdus Subhan	Rashtriya Janata Dal
2020	Syed Ruknuddin Ahmad	All India Majlis-e-Ittehadul Muslimeen
2020	Syed Ruknuddin Ahmad	Rashtriya Janata Dal
2025	Ghulam Sarwar	All India Majlis-e-Ittehadul Muslimeen

^by-election

== Election results ==
=== 2025 ===
2025 Bihar Legislative Assembly election: Baisi
Party	Candidate	Votes	%	±%
AIMIM	Ghulam Sarwar	92,766	41.37	+3.1
BJP	Vinod Kumar	65,515	29.22	+0.11
RJD	Abdus Subhan	56,000	24.97	+3.57
PECP	Mohammad Muzammil	2,444	1.09	
JSP	Md Shahnawaz Alam	2,389	1.07	
NOTA	None of the above	3,074	1.37	−0.33
Majority		27,251	12.15	+2.99
Turnout		224,244	78.17	+12.86
AIMIM hold		Swing		

=== 2020 ===
In the 2020 Bihar Assembly Elections, Syed Ruknuddin Ahmad of AIMIM defeated BJP Vinod Kumar.

Bihar Assembly election, 2020: Baisi
Party	Candidate	Votes	%	±%
AIMIM	Syed Ruknuddin Ahmad	68,416	38.27	+27.9
BJP	Vinod Kumar	52,043	29.11	
RJD	Abdus Subhan	38,254	21.4	−20.15
Independent	Ghulam Sarwar	5,075	2.84	
Independent	Md Rashid Raza	2,626	1.47	
JAP(L)	Israil Azad	2,404	1.34	−11.93
NOTA	None of the above	3,042	1.7	−1.5
Majority		16,373	9.16	−14.86
Turnout		178,787	65.31	−0.12
AIMIM gain from RJD		Swing		

=== 2015 ===
In the 2015 Bihar Assembly Elections, Abdus Subhan of RJD defeated independent Binod Kumar.

2015 Bihar Legislative Assembly election: Baisi
Party	Candidate	Votes	%	±%
RJD	Abdus Subhan	67,022	41.55	
Independent	Vinod Kumar	28,282	17.53	
JAP(L)	Syed Ruknuddin Ahmad	21,404	13.27	
AIMIM	Ghulam Sarwar	16,723	10.37	
RLSP	Azizur Rahman	9,573	5.93	
Independent	Khursheed Alam	3,361	2.08	
SP	Mukesh Kumar Yadav	2,875	1.78	
Ittehad-E-Millait Council	Rizwan Ahamad Noori	2,559	1.59	
BSP	Harun Rasid	1,474	0.91	
NOTA	None of the above	5,160	3.2	
Majority		38,740	24.02	
Turnout		161,320	65.43	
