= Md Afaque Alam =

Member of Indian Bihar Legislative Assembly

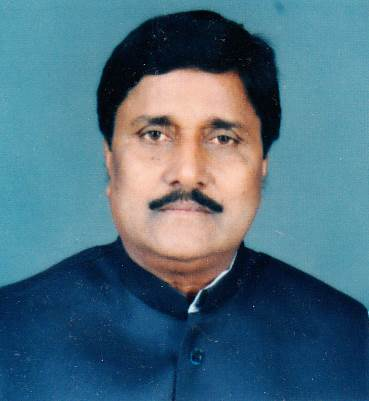

Minister for Animal Husbandry & Fisheries Government of Bihar
- In office 16 August 2022 – 28 January 2024
- Chief Minister: Nitish Kumar
- Deputy Chief Minister: Tejashwi Yadav
- Preceded by: Tarkishore Prasad

Member of the Bihar Legislative Assembly
- In office 2010–2025
- Preceded by: Pradip Kumar Das
- Succeeded by: Nitesh Kumar Singh
- Constituency: Kasba

Personal details
- Party: Indian National Congress

Md Afaque Alam is an Indian politician belonging to Indian National Congress. He is a member of the Bihar Legislative Assembly. He won from Kasba, Purnia in the Feb 2005, 2010, 2015 and 2020 Bihar Legislative Assembly election. He was the deputy leader of Indian National Congress in Bihar Legislative Assembly and also the general secretary of Mahagathbandhan (Bihar). He lost in 2025.
