= Maithili Academy =

Autonomous organisation

- Formation: 1976; 50 years ago
- Location: Patna, Bihar, India

Maithili Academy is an autonomous organisation of the Government of Bihar dedicated to the promotion of the Maithili language, its literature and culture, founded in 1976 at the urging of chief minister Jagannath Mishra. Its first chairman was Srikant Thakur Vidyalankar.

The academy publishes books in Maithili along with a fortnightly magazine. Its publication Uccatara Maithilī Vyãkaraṇa (Higher Maithili grammar) by G. Jha has been described as "the most noteworthy contribution to the field of Maithili linguistics."
