= Goasi =

Village in Bihar, India

Goasi village Baijnathpur
- village
- Location within Bihar Location within India
- Coordinates: 25.764262°N 87.415538°E
- Country: India
- State: Bihar
- District: Purnea district

Government
  - mukhya (Head of the Village): Afroz Alam

Languages
  - Official: Hindi, English
- Time zone: UTC+5:30 (IST)
- ISO 3166 code: IN-BR
- Website: {{URL|example.com|optional display text}}

Goasi, previously known as Chunapur, is a village in the Purnea district of India. This village is under the K nagar block. The air force station A.F.S. Goasi is near the village. Goasi is near to the Kalikoshi river, an abandoned channel of the river Koshi. There are twelve wards in the village.

At the time of the 2001 census, there were 1,475 households in Goasi. The main occupation of its occupants is agriculture. Hindu people live in the community. Some engineers and doctors also live in the village.

== See also ==
- List of villages in Araria
