= Eastern Maithili =

- Purbi Maithili
- 𑒣𑒴𑒩𑒥𑒲 𑒧𑒻𑒟𑒱𑒪𑒲 • पूरबी मैथिली
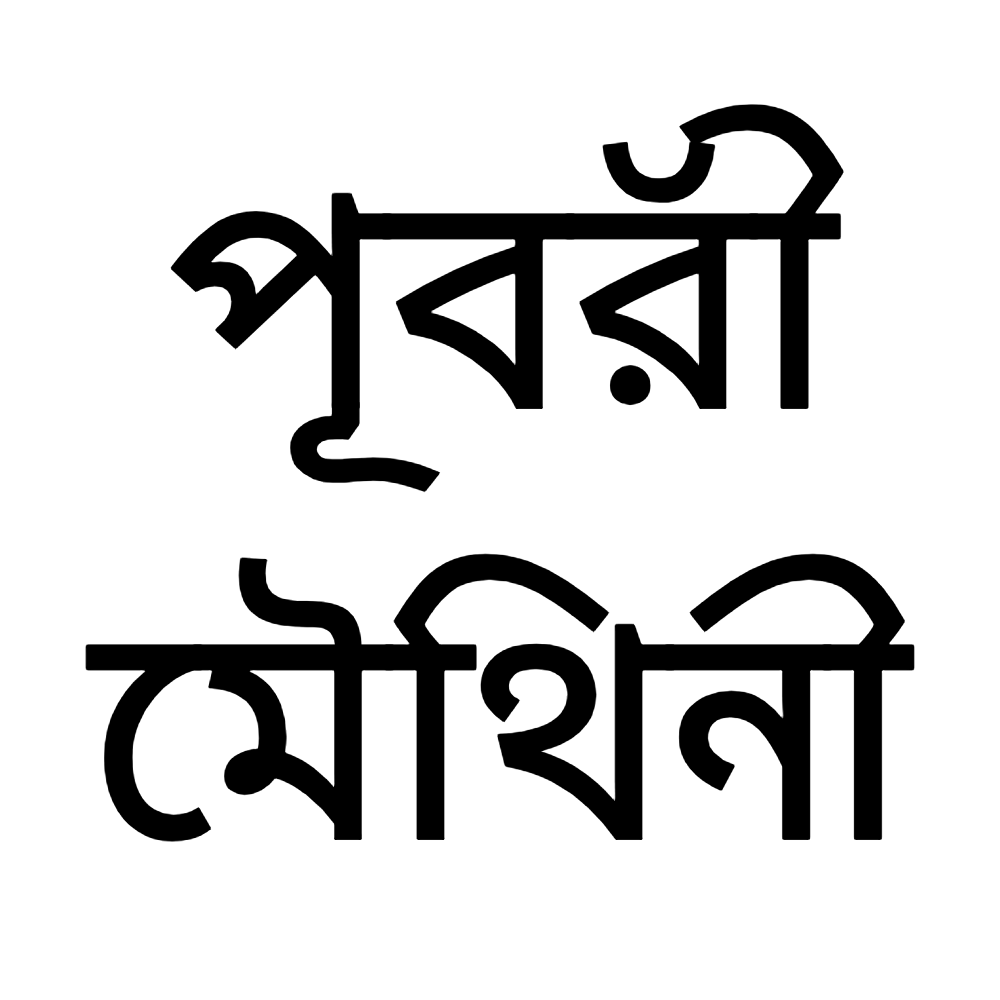
- Purbi Maithili written in Tirhuta script
- Native to: India
- Region: Mithila
- Ethnicity: Maithils
- Native speakers: 11,100 (2011)
- Language family: Indo-European: Indo-Iranian; Indo-Aryan; Eastern; Bihari; Maithili; Eastern Maithili
- Writing system: Tirhuta and Devanagari

Language codes
- ISO 639-3: mai
- Glottolog: east2315 Eastern Maithili

Eastern Maithili or Purbi Maithili is a dialect of Maithili language, spoken primarily in Mithila region of India. It is mainly spoken in Purnia division of Bihar, India. It has almost 11,116 speakers according to the 2011 census of India. It is very similar to the Angika dialect of Maithili, which is spoken in the Bhagalpur and Dumka regions. Like its neighbor Bengali, it is phonetically characterized by a rounded 'a' sound (halfway between 'a' and 'o', similar to the 'o' in the Bengali name 'Subroto') at the end of certain words.

== See also ==
- Maithili language
- Mithila region
- Purnia division
