= Amour Assembly constituency =

Coordinates: 25.97°N 87.72°E

Amour
- Constituency No. 56 for the Bihar Legislative Assembly

Constituency details
- Country: India
- Region: East India
- State: Bihar
- Lok Sabha constituency: Kishanganj
- Established: 1951
- Total electors: 312,866
- Reservation: None

Member of Legislative Assembly
- 18th Bihar Legislative Assembly
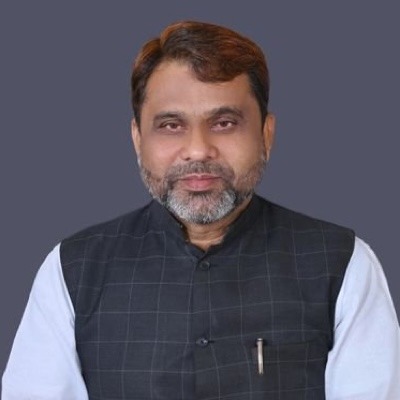
- Incumbent Akhtarul Iman
- Party: AIMIM
- Alliance: None
- Elected year: 2025

Amour Assembly constituency is an assembly constituency in Purnia district in the Indian state of Bihar.

== Overview ==
As per Delimitation of Parliamentary and Assembly constituencies Order, 2008, No 56 Amour Assembly constituency is composed of the following: Amour and Baisa community development blocks.

Amour Assembly constituency is part of No 10 Kishanganj (Lok Sabha constituency).

== Members of the Legislative Assembly ==
Year	Name	Party
1952	Mohammad Tahir	Indian National Congress
1957	Mohammad Ismail	Independent
1962	Mohammad Alijan	Indian National Congress
1967	Hasibur Rahman	Praja Socialist Party
1969	Hasibur Rahman	Praja Socialist Party
1972	Hasibur Rahman	Independent
1977	Chandrashekhar Jha	Janata Party
1980	Moijuddin Minshi	Indian National Congress
1985	Abdul Zalil Mastan	Independent
1990	Abdul Zalil Mastan	Indian National Congress
1995	Muzaffar Hussain	Samajwadi Party
1997^	Saba Zafar	Independent
2000	Abdul Jalil Mastan	Indian National Congress
2005	Abdul Jalil Mastan	Indian National Congress
2005	Abdul Jalil Mastan	Indian National Congress
2010	Saba Zafar	Bharatiya Janata Party
2015	Abdul Zalil Mastan	Indian National Congress
2020	Akhtarul Iman	All India Majlis-e-Ittehadul Muslimeen
2025	Akhtarul Iman	All India Majlis-e-Ittehadul Muslimeen

== Election results ==
=== 2025 ===
2025 Bihar Legislative Assembly election: Amour
Party	Candidate	Votes	%	±%
AIMIM	Akhtarul Iman	100,836	43.5	▼7.67
JD(U)	Saba Zafar	61,908	26.71	▲3.99
INC	Abdul Zalil Mastan	52,791	22.77	▲5.51
Independent	Mohd Parvej Alam	4,585	1.98	
JSP	Afaroj	3,802	1.64	
AAP	Md Muntazir Alam	2,310	1.0	
NOTA	None of the above	3,187	1.37	▼1.32
Majority		38,928	16.79	▼11.66
Turnout		231,808	74.09	▲15.28
AIMIM hold		Swing		

=== 2020 ===
Bihar Assembly election, 2020: Amour
Party	Candidate	Votes	%	±%
AIMIM	Akhtarul Iman	94,459	51.17	▲50.01
JD(U)	Saba Zafar	41,944	22.72	
INC	Abdul Zalil Mastan	31,863	17.26	▼41.9
JAP(L)	Kumar Gupta	3,164	1.71	▲0.67
Janta Dal Rashtravadi	Matiur Rahman	1,673	0.91	
NOTA	None of the above	4,958	2.69	▲0.85
Majority		52,515	28.45	▼2.27
Turnout		184,606	58.81	▼1.44
AIMIM gain from INC		Swing		

=== 2015 ===
General Election to the Legislative Assembly of Bihar was held in 5 phases. Amour Assembly constituency had its polling in the last phase on 5 November 2015 and the result was declared on 8 November 2015.Candidates:

A total of 14 candidates filed their nominations, including one woman candidate. Out of those 14, one candidate withdraw his name from the candidature. 13 candidates contested the election, including the women candidate. Out of 13 candidates, 11 candidates' deposits were forfeited.Electors and voters:

Total number of 2,80,910 electors (1,49,626 male and 1,31,274 female) were registered. Out of those, only 1,69,281 (60.26%) voters turned out to cast their votes in 275 polling stations.Result:

Abdul Jalil Mastan of the Indian National Congress Party won the election by a margin of 51,997 votes (31.30% of total valid votes). The total votes cast in his favour was 1,00,135. Runner-up Saba Zafar of Bharatiya Janata Party received 48,138 votes.

2015 Bihar Legislative Assembly election: Amour
Party	Candidate	Votes	%	±%
INC	Abdul Jalil Mastan	100,135	59.16	
BJP	Saba Zafar	48,138	28.44	
SS	Anima Das	4,393	2.6	
BSP	Md Nasim Akhter	2,458	1.45	
AIMIM	Md Nawazish Alam	1,955	1.16	
JAP(L)	Babar Azam	1,763	1.04	
NOTA	None of the above	3,106	1.84	
Majority		51,997	30.72	
Turnout		169,250	60.25	

=== 2010 ===
In the November 2010 state assembly elections, Saba Zafar of BJP won the Amour assembly seat defeating his nearest rival Abdul Jalil Mastan of Congress. Contests in most years were multi cornered but only winners and runners are being mentioned. Abdul Jalil Mastan of Congress defeated Saba Jafar representing SP in October 2005, contesting as an independent in February 2005 and representing RJD in 2000. Muzaffar Hussain of SP defeated Abdul Jalil Mastan of Congress in 1995. A. Jalil of Congress defeated Muzaffar Hussain of ICS (SCS). Jalil, Independent, defeated Chandra Sekhar Jha of JP in 1985. M. Moijuddin Munshi of Congress defeated Nazmuddin of Janata Party (Secular – Raj Narain). Chandra Sekhar Jha of JP defeated Md. Moijuddin Munshi of Congress.
