= Purnia district =

District in Bihar, India

- District of Bihar
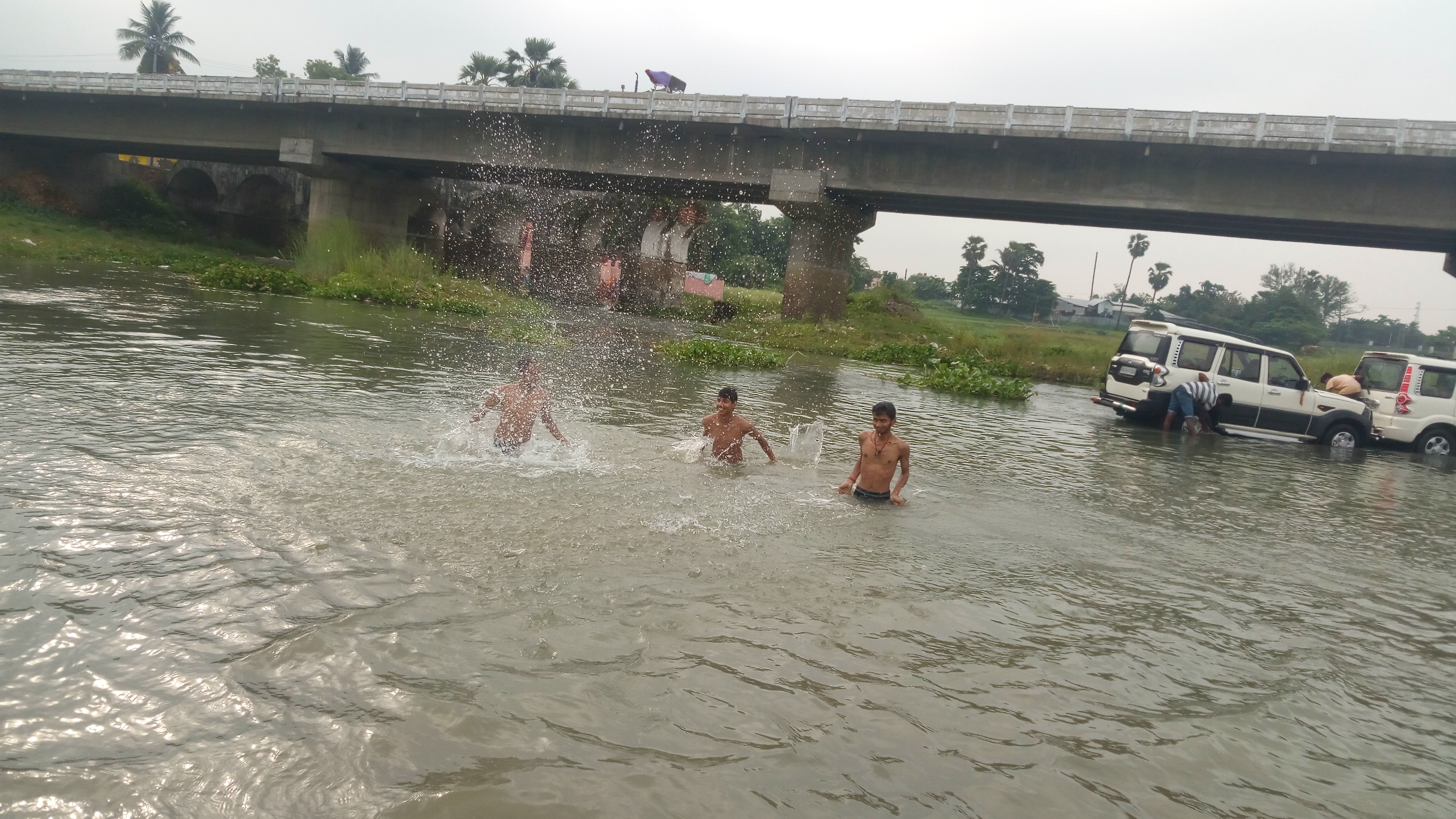
- Saura river near Purnia
- Interactive map of Purnia district
- Coordinates (Purnia): 24°29′N 86°42′E
- Country: India
- State: Bihar
- Region: Mithila
- Division: Purnia
- Established: 14 February 1770
- Headquarters: Purnia

Government
  - District Magistrate: Mr. Anshul Kumar, IAS
  - Lok Sabha constituencies: Purnia; Kishanganj (for Baisi, Dagarua, Amour and Baisa Blocks)
  - Vidhan Sabha constituencies: Amour, Baisi, Kasba, Banmankhi, Rupauli, Dhamdaha, Purnia,

Area
  - Total: 3,229 km^{2} (1,247 sq mi)

Population (2011)
  - Total: 3,264,619
  - Density: 1,011/km^{2} (2,619/sq mi)

Demographics
  - Literacy: 72.09 per cent
  - Sex ratio: 921

Language
  - Official: Hindi
  - Additional official: Urdu
  - Regional Languages: Maithili
- Time zone: UTC+05:30 (IST)
- Vehicle registration: BR-11
- Major highways: NH 27; NH 231; NH 131A
- Website: purnea.nic.in

Purnia district is one of the thirty-eight districts of the Indian state of Bihar. The district lies in the Kosi-Seemanchal subregion of the greater Mithila region of the state. The city of Purnia is the administrative headquarters of this district. Purnia City has continued its tradition of hoisting the national flag at 12:07 am on every Independence Day since 1947. Purnia district is a part of Purnia Division. The district extends northwards from the Ganga river in the easternmost part of Bihar.

== Geography ==
Purnia district occupies 3,229 square kilometres (1,247 sq mi), comparable to the Solomon Islands' Makira Island. It is a depressed tract, consisting for the most part of a rich, loamy alluvial soil. It is traversed by several rivers flowing from the Himalayas, which afford great advantages of irrigation and water-carriage. Its major rivers are the Kosi, the Mahananda, the Suwara Kali, the Kari kosi, the Saura and the Koli. In the west, the soil is thickly covered with sand deposited by changes in the course of the Kosi. Among other rivers are the Mahananda and the Panar. Its major agricultural products are jute, maize and banana.

== History ==
Purnia is part of the Mithila region. Mithila first gained prominence after it was settled by Indo-Aryan peoples who established the Mithila Kingdom (also called Kingdom of the Videhas).

During the late Vedic period (c. 1100–500 BCE), Videha became one of the major political and cultural centers of Ancient India, along with Kuru and Pañcāla. The kings of the Videha Kingdom were called Janakas. The Videha Kingdom was later incorporated into the Vajji confederacy, which had its capital in the city of Vaishali, which is also in Mithila. The eastern part of Purnia formed part of the region of Pundravardhana, part of ancient Bengal. It must have been part of Shashanka's kingdom, and eventually became part of the kingdom of Magadha in the 11th century.

In the ending period of the 12th century Bakhtiyar Khilji invaded Bihar and parts of Bengal and conquered both for the Delhi Sultanate. However the northern part of the district still seems to have been held by the Kirat peoples as the Muslim rulers kept having to protect the district from their incursions. However, not much is known of its rule during the period from 13th to 17th centuries other than it was a military frontier. It is known that it formed the border of the Bengal Sultanate and eventually supplied levies to Humayun during his war with the Suri dynasty.

During the Mughal period, what is now Purnia district was part of the sarkars of Purania and Tajpur in the Bengal Subah, which were separated by the Mahananda River. The northern strip of the district along the Nepal border was part of the Kingdom of Morang, part of Limbuwan. During the late Mughal period five mahals from Munger Sarkar were annexed to Purania Sarkar, prior to this the border between Bihar Subah and Bengal Subah was the Kosi River. During the Mughal rule, Purnea was an outlying military province, and its revenue was mostly spent on protecting its borders against tribes from the north and east.

In the beginning of the 18th century, the Faujdar of Purnia was Saif Khan, a descendant of Afghan nobles. At the time the Kosi flowed close to Purnia town and the western part of the present district formed part of the kingdom of Bir Shah, Raja of Birnagar, who had a force of 15,000 men and did not acknowledge Mughal authority. Saif Khan conquered Birnagar from Bir Shah's son, Drujan Singh. The territory was annexed to Purnia in 1732. He also subjugated other zamindars and expanded the Nawab's control around 30 km into the Terai. His son Fakhruddin Hussain Khan was known as an incompetent governor who was quickly replaced with the Nawab's nephew Sayyid Ahmed Khan. Fakhruddin was forced to move to Murshidabad. During one of the Maratha incursions he hoped to again throw off Nawab domination and raised another army in Purnia, but was soon cowed again.

After the capture of Calcutta in 1757, Purnia's local governor raised a rebellion against Siraj ud-Daulah. In 1765, the district became a British possession, along with the rest of Bengal. On 14 February 1770 the district of Purnia in modern history was formed by the East India Company.

Purnia is known for its uniquely designed organisation, Ramakrishna Mission, where the festival Durga Puja is celebrated in October. Another attraction in the city of Purnia is the oldest temple of Mata Puran Devi which is 5 km away from the main city. It is theorised that Purnia received its name from this temple. Other theories also describe how Purnia received its name; which is, that in the past Purnia was named Purna– Aranya, which stands for "complete jungle."

Three districts were partitioned off from Purnia district: Katihar in 1976, Araria and Kishanganj in 1990.

== Divisions ==
Purnia district has four subdivisions: Purnea Sadar, Banmankhi, Baisi and Dhamdaha.

=== Blocks ===
They are further divided into fourteen blocks:

Tehsil (Sub-division)	CD Blocks
Purnia Sadar	Purnia East, Kasba, Jalalgarh, Krityanand Nagar, Srinagar
Banmankhi	Banmankhi
Dhamdaha	Dhamdaha, Barhara Kothi, Bhawanipur, Rupauli
Baisi	Baisi, Baisa, Amour, Dagarua

These contain 246 panchayats with 1,450 villages.

== Demographics ==
Historical population
Year	Pop.	±% p.a.
1901	478,222	—
1911	513,879	+0.72%
1921	548,740	+0.66%
1931	593,534	+0.79%
1941	646,133	+0.85%
1951	685,744	+0.60%
1961	938,810	+3.19%
1971	1,191,510	+2.41%
1981	1,518,223	+2.45%
1991	1,878,885	+2.15%
2001	2,543,942	+3.08%
2011	3,264,619	+2.53%

According to the 2011 census Purnia district has a population of 3,264,619, roughly equal to the nation of Mauritania or the US state of Iowa. This gives it a ranking of 105th in India (out of a total of 640). The district has a population density of 1,014 inhabitants per square kilometre (2,630/sq mi). Its population growth rate over the decade 2001-2011 was 28.66%. Purnia has a sex ratio of 930 females for every 1000 males, and a literacy rate of 58.23%. 10.51% of the population lives in urban areas. Scheduled Castes and Scheduled Tribes make up 11.98% and 4.27% of the population respectively.

Religions in Purnia district (2011)
Religion	Percent
Hinduism	60.94%
Islam	38.46%
Other or not stated	0.60%

Hindus are the majority community in the district, but Muslims are majority in the eastern blocks.

Block	Hindu %	Muslim %	Other %
Banmankhi	86.19	13.33	0.48
Barhara	90.37	9.11	0.52
Bhawanipur	75.48	24.07	0.45
Rupauli	89.20	10.57	0.23
Dhamdaha	84.32	14.55	1.13
Krityanand Nagar	67.07	32.03	0.9
Purnia East	68.52	30.26	1.22
Kasba	41.63	58.08	0.29
Srinagar	65.91	33.69	0.4
Jalalgarh	53.41	46.28	0.31
Amour	22.58	76.93	0.49
Baisa	27.76	71.94	0.3
Baisi	22.37	77.32	0.31
Dagarua	37.17	62.55	0.28

Languages in Purnia district (2011)
1. Hindi (33.7%)
2. Urdu (18.6%)
3. 'Other' Hindi (18.5%)
4. Maithili (10.7%)
5. Surjapuri (8.73%)
6. Bengali (4.51%)
7. Santali (2.50%)
8. Others (2.71%)

At the time of the 2011 Census of India, 33.68% of the population in the district spoke Hindi, 18.62% Urdu, 10.72% Maithili (including Thethi and Purbi), 8.73% Surjapuri, 4.51% Bengali and 2.50% Santali as their first language. 18.53% spoke languages recorded as 'Others' under Hindi group of languages on the census.

== Politics ==
District	No.	Constituency	Name	Party	Alliance	Remarks
Purnia	56	Amour	Akhtarul Iman	AIMIM	None	
Purnia	57	Baisi	Ghulam Sarwar	AIMIM	None	
Purnia	58	Kasba	Nitesh Kumar Singh	LJP(RV)	NDA	
Purnia	59	Banmankhi (SC)	Krishna Kumar Rishi	BJP	NDA	
Purnia	60	Rupauli	Kaladhar Mandal	JD(U)	NDA	
Purnia	61	Dhamdaha	Leshi Singh	JD(U)	NDA	
Purnia	62	Purnia	Vijay Kumar Khemka	BJP	NDA	

== Economy ==
Purnia district has a mostly agrarian economy with few factories, most of which are situated in Maranga. Out of Bihar's districts, Purnea district is ranked the second poorest in multidimensional poverty, struggling with high population growth, low urbanisation and sparse to low number of industry.

== Culture ==
=== Shrines ===
Some major Hindu temples of Purnea are Puran Devi temple; which is sometimes credited for the name of the city, the Kali Mandir of old Purnia city on the bank of Saura river, the Maata Asthan in Chunapur, Panchmukhi Temple in line bazaar, the Rani Sati Mandir in Kasba, Prahlad Stambh in Banmankhi, and Dhima Shiv Mandir in Dhima, Banmankhi. The city also has the Darghah of Hazrat Mustafa Jamalul Haque Bandagi, Chimni Bazar. An "Urs" in the form of Mela (village fair) is organised on the 7th day after Eid-Ul-Azha and continues up to 3 days every year. The 'Dargah and Khanquah Alia Mustafia' is located 7 km away from the main city. It is famous for spirituality, communal harmony and Sufism. Its history extends for 400 years, when Hazrat Bandagi came from Jaunpur, Uttar Pradesh visiting several Khanqahs and Dargahs across India such as the Pandawa Sharif, the Bihar Sharif, etc. The Darghah is playing a major role to spread culture, education, kindness, secularism and spiritual spirits in Northeast Bihar since its establishment. Deorhi at Garbanili (Purnea) hosts the ruins of Kala Bhawan the ancient Darbar (Palace) of Raja Kalanand Singh, where his successor still lives.

The Jalalgadh Fort is a place of historical importance situated in Jalalgadh division.

== River ==
Purnia district is primarily drained by three major rivers:

- Kari Kosi River: The Kari Kosi River, an old abandoned channel of the Kosi River, flows through Purnia District. It is an important river in the region and has a significant impact on the local landscape and livelihoods.
- Mahananda River: The Mahananda River is another prominent river in Purnia District. It is a tributary of the Ganges and contributes to the overall drainage system of the area.
- Saura River: The Saura river is one of the two rivers flowing through Purnia (city). It flows east of main city separating Gulabbagh and Khushkibagh from the main town.
