= Kasba, Bihar Assembly constituency =

Coordinates: 25°51′N 87°33′E

Kasba
- Constituency No. 58 for the Bihar Legislative Assembly

Constituency details
- Country: India
- Region: East India
- State: Bihar
- District: Purnia
- Established: 1967
- Total electors: 287,959
- Reservation: None

Member of Legislative Assembly
- 18th Bihar Legislative Assembly
- Incumbent Nitesh Kumar Singh
- Party: LJP(RV)
- Alliance: NDA
- Elected year: 2025

Kasba Assembly constituency is an assembly constituency in Purnia district in the Indian state of Bihar.

== Overview ==
As per Delimitation of Parliamentary and Assembly constituencies Order, 2008, No 58 Kasba Assembly constituency is composed of the following: Kasba, Srinagar and Jalalgarh community development blocks; Kohbara, Bela Rikabganj and Jhunni Istambrar gram panchayats of Krityanand Nagar CD Block.

Kasba Assembly constituency is part of No 12 Purnia (Lok Sabha constituency).

== Members of the Legislative Assembly ==
Year	Name	Party
1967	Ram Narayan Mandal	Indian National Congress
1969	Ram Narayan Mandal	Indian National Congress
1972	Ram Narayan Mandal	Indian National Congress
1977	Jai Narayan Mehta	Indian National Congress
1980	Mohammed Yasin	Indian National Congress (I)
1985	Syed Gulam Hussein	Indian National Congress
1990	Shiv Charan Mehta	Janata Dal
1995	Pradeep Kumar Das	Bharatiya Janata Party
2000	Pradeep Kumar Das	Bharatiya Janata Party
2005	Afaque Alam	Samajwadi Party
2005	Pradeep Kumar Das	Bharatiya Janata Party
2010	Afaque Alam	Indian National Congress
2015	Afaque Alam	Indian National Congress
2020	Afaque Alam	Indian National Congress
2025	Nitesh Kumar Singh	Lok Janshakti Party (Ram Vilas)

== Election results ==
=== 2025 ===
2025 Bihar Legislative Assembly election: Kasba
Party	Candidate	Votes	%	±%
LJP(RV)	Nitesh Kumar Singh	86,877	36.81	
INC	Md. Irfan Alam	74,002	31.36	−9.76
AIMIM	Md. Shahnawaz Alam	35,286	14.95	12.13
Independent	Pradeep Kumar Das	11,212	4.75	
Independent	Subodh Rishidev	6,674	2.83	
Independent	Md. Afaque Alam	6,044	2.56	
JSP	Md. Irfan Alam	3,430	1.45	
Independent	Rajendra Yadav	2,675	1.13	
Independent	Hayat Ashraf	2,546	1.08	
NOTA	None of the above	4,050	1.72	−0.41
Majority		12,875	5.45	−3.73
Turnout		236,009	81.96	+15.54
LJP(RV) gain from INC		Swing		

=== 2020 ===
2020 Bihar Legislative Assembly election: Kasba
Party	Candidate	Votes	%	±%
INC	Mohammad Afaque Alam	77,410	41.12	−3.62
LJP	Pradeep Kumar Das	60,132	31.94	
HAM(S)	Rajendra Yadav	23,716	12.6	
Independent	Md Ittefaque Alam @ Munna Bhai	8,009	4.25	
AIMIM	Md Shahbaz Alam	5,316	2.82	
The Plurals Party	Hayat Ashraf	1585	0.81	
NOTA	None of the above	4,012	2.13	+1.0
Majority		17,278	9.18	+8.19
Turnout		188,247	66.42	−2.61
INC hold		Swing		

=== 2015 ===
2015 Bihar Legislative Assembly election: Kasba
Party	Candidate	Votes	%	±%
INC	Md. Afaque Alam	81,633	44.74	
BJP	Pradip Kumar Das	79,839	43.75	
Independent	Sanjay Kumar Mirdha	4,777	2.62	
Independent	Sada Nand Yadav	2,777	1.52	
NCP	Syed Ghulam Hussain	2,669	1.46	
BSP	Ajeet Kumar Mehta	2,318	1.27	
NOTA	None of the above	2,058	1.13	
Majority		1,794	0.99	
Turnout		182,478	69.03	
