= Surjapuri language =

Indo-Aryan language spoken in India

Surjapuri
- সুরজাপুরী · सुरजापुरी
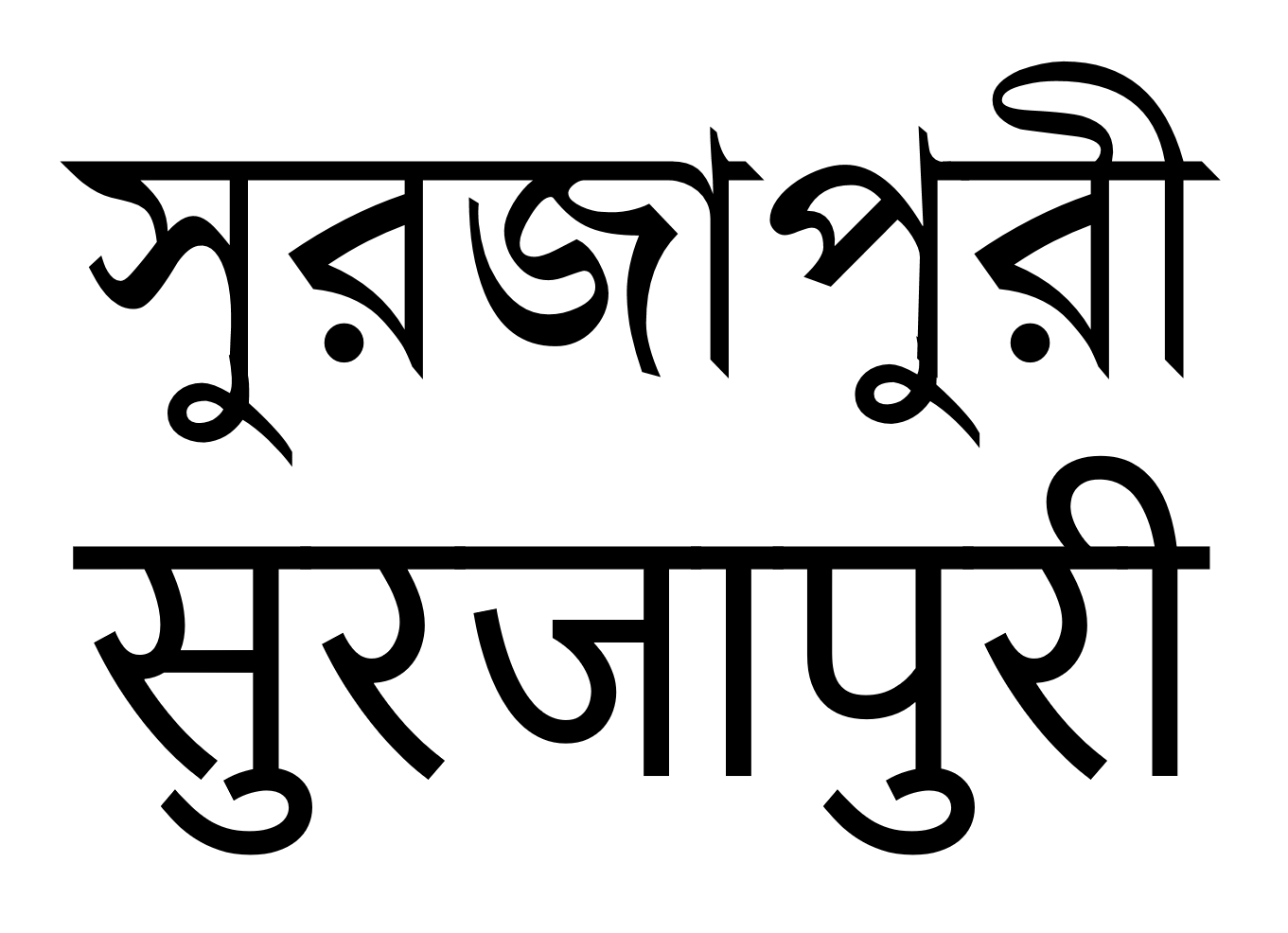
- 'Surjapuri' in Bengali & Devanagari scripts
- Pronunciation: [surd͡ʒaˈpuɾi]
- Native to: India, Nepal, Bangladesh
- Region: Bihar, (Kosi-Seemanchal) and West Bengal (Islampur)
- Ethnicity: Surjapuri
- Native speakers: 2,256,228 (2011 census)
- Language family: Indo-European: Indo-Iranian; Indo-Aryan; Eastern; Odia–Bengali–Assamese; Bengali–Assamese; Kamrupa; Kamta; Western Kamta; Surjapuri
- Writing system: Devanagari, Bengali–Assamese, Kaithi (historical)

Language codes
- ISO 639-3: sjp
- Glottolog: surj1235
- This is a map of the KRDS lect, with the Surjapuri-speaking area shown in the North-West (in Bihar and adjoining areas of West Bengal).

Surjapuri is an Indo-Aryan language of the Bengali-Assamese branch, spoken in Eastern India, in the Kosi-Seemanchal region, including some eastern parts of Purnia division (Kishanganj, Katihar, Purnia, and Araria districts) of Bihar, parts of Uttar Dinajpur district in West Bengal and Goalpara Division of Assam in India, as well as parts of Thakurgaon district in Bangladesh and Jhapa district in Nepal. It possesses similarities with Kamatapuri, Assamese, Bengali, Maithili, Urdu, and Hindi.

== Geographical distribution ==
Surjapuri is mainly spoken in some parts of Purnia division (Kishanganj, Katihar, Purnia, and Araria districts) of Bihar. It is also spoken in West Bengal (some parts of Islampur subdivision of Uttar Dinajpur district and Jalpaiguri division in northern Bengal region), Bangladesh (Thakurgaon District) as well as in parts of eastern Nepal of Jhapa District and Morang District.

== Related languages ==
Surjapuri is associated with the Kamtapuri language (and its dialects Goalpariya, Rajbanshi and Koch Rajbangshi) spoken in North Bengal and Western Assam, as well as with Assamese, Bengali, and Maithili.

=== Pronouns ===
		Singular		Plural	
		nominative	oblique	nominative	oblique
1st person		mũi	mo-	hāmrā	hāmsā-, hāmcā-
2nd person		tũi	to-	tumrā, tomrā	tumsā-, tomsā-
3rd person	proximal	yāhāy	yahā-	emrā, erā	ismā-, isā-
3rd person	distal	wahā̃y	wahā-	amrā, worā	usmā-, usā-

Surjapuri has the oblique plural suffixes: sā (hamsā-, tomsā-) and smā (ismā-, usmā-). They are also seen in Early Assamese as: sā (āmāsā-, tomāsā-) and sambā (esambā-, tesambā-) and their occurrences are similar.

== Phonology ==
=== Consonants ===
		Labial	Dental/ Alveolar	Retroflex	Post-alv./ Palatal	Velar	Glottal
Nasal		m	n			ŋ	
Stop/ Affricate	voiceless	p	t	ʈ	tʃ	k	
Stop/ Affricate	aspirated	pʰ	tʰ	ʈʰ	tʃʰ	kʰ	
Stop/ Affricate	voiced	b	d	ɖ	dʒ	ɡ	
Stop/ Affricate	breathy	bʱ	dʱ	ɖʱ	dʒʱ	ɡʱ	
Fricative			s				h
Tap			ɾ				
Lateral			l				
Approximant		w			j		

=== Vowels ===
	Front	Central	Back
High	i		u
Mid	e	ə	o
Mid			ɔ
Low	æ	ɑ	

- Nasalisation is also phonemic.
- /i, e/ in medial and initial form are heard as [ɪ, ɛ].
