= Baisi, Bihar =

Baisi बायसी
- City
- Location in Bihar, India
- Coordinates: 25°52′0″N 87°45′0″E
- Country: India
- State: Bihar
- Region: Mithila
- District: Purnia district
- Established: 1908

Government
  - Body: Baisi Municipality

Area
  - Total: 7 km^{2} (2.7 sq mi)
- Elevation: 26 m (85 ft)

Population
  - Total: 100,000
  - Density: 14,000/km^{2} (37,000/sq mi)

Languages
  - Official: Hindi, Urdu
  - Regional: Surjapuri, Maithili
- Time zone: UTC+5:30 (IST)
- PIN: 854315
- Vehicle registration: BR 11
- Sex ratio: 935/1000 ♂/♀
- Literacy: 67.38%
- Lok Sabha constituency: Kishanganj
- Civic agency: Baisi Municipality

Baisi is a City and Sub District in Purnia district of Bihar, India.

== Demographics ==
According to government data, Baisi has approximately 1,319 households. All of which are classified as rural.

The female-to-male ratio in Baisi is 95.72%, which is higher than the state average of 91.93%.

The overall literacy rate is 35.98%, lower than the state average of 47%.

The female literacy rate is 21.39%, while the male literacy rate of 50.05%.

== Education ==
This city is very popular in the area because it has more than 20 secondary schools which provide good job opportunities in the education sector.

There are hundreds of students coming from nearby villages for primary education. There is a Baisi degree college where students can complete their graduation degree. There is also a Government secondary school for girls, popularly known as "Project Girls School", which provides education for girls.

== Location ==
NH 31 passes through Baisi. The nearest airport is Purnea Airport. Bagdogra Airport is the second nearest airport. Purnia and Dalkhola are the nearest railway stations. SH 99 connects Baisi with the nearby small towns of Rauta and Amour. This city is nearby to the hill station like Darjeeling and siliguri. It is famous for delicacies like samosa and Neemki
