= Ghulam Sarwar (AIMIM politician) =

Indian politician

Member of Bihar Legislative Assembly
- Incumbent
- Assumed office 2025
- Preceded by: Syed Ruknuddin Ahmad
- Constituency: Baisi

Personal details
- Party: All India Majlis-e-Ittehadul Muslimeen

Ghulam Sarwar is an Indian politician from All India Majlis-e-Ittehadul Muslimeen and a member of Bihar Legislative Assembly from Baisi Assembly constituency seat.
