= Nitesh Kumar Singh =

Member of Indian Bihar Legislative Assembly

Member of the Bihar Legislative Assembly
- Incumbent
- Assumed office 1 December 2025
- Chief Minister: Nitish Kumar
- Deputy Chief Minister: Samrat Choudhary,Vijay Kumar Sinha
- Incumbent
- Assumed office 2025
- Preceded by: Md Afaque Alam
- Constituency: Kasba

Personal details
- Born: 31 December 1984 (age 41)
- Party: Lok Janshakti Party (Ram Vilas)

Nitesh Kumar Singh is an Indian politician belonging to Lok Janshakti Party (Ram Vilas). He is a member of the Bihar Legislative Assembly. He won from Kasba, Purnia in the 2025 Bihar Legislative Assembly election. The results for the Kasba Assembly seat have been declared. LJPRV candidate Nitesh Kumar Singh has won the election, securing a total of 86877 votes defeating Irfan Alam.

== Personal life ==
Singh was born on 31 December 1984 to Braj Kishore Singh and hails from a Rajput Family . He resides in Purnea, Bihar, and completed his higher secondary education from RKK College in 2001. Alongside his political career, he works as the chief executive officer of ReIndia Property Management Pvt Ltd.
