= Kosi-Seemanchal =

Region of Bihar, India

- Subregion
- Country: India
- State: Bihar
- Region: Mithila
- Largest city: Purnia
- Divisions: Kosi and Purnia

Languages
  - Official: Hindi
  - Additional official: Urdu
  - Regional: Maithili (including Thēthi and Angika), Surjapuri, Bengali
- Time zone: UTC+5:30 (IST)
- Major highways: NH 27, NH 31, NH 231, NH 131A, NH 131
- Major Railway Lines: Barauni-Katihar, Saharsa and Purnia sections Barauni-Guwahati line

Kosi-Seemanchal is in the Northeastern part of Bihar. It is a subregion within the larger cultural region of Mithila.It consists of Kosi and Purnia divisions. It has seven districts — Araria, Madhepura, Saharsa, Supaul, Purnea, Kishanganj and Katihar. Supaul, Saharsa and Madhepura in Kosi Region and Purnia, Katihar, Araria and Kishanganj in seemanchal region.

Cities in Kosi–Seemanchal subregion with population over 1 lakh (Census 2011)
Rank	City/Town	District	Population (2011)	Remarks
1	Purnia (UA)	Purnia	312,669	Urban Agglomeration
2	Katihar (UA)	Katihar	240,838	Urban Agglomeration
3	Saharsa	Saharsa	156,540	Municipality
4	Kishanganj	Kishanganj	105,782	Nagar Parishad

== Name ==
The name of the Kosi division comes from the Kosi River which flows through the region. On the other hand, Seemanchal (border area) is a colloquial alternate term for Purnia division owing to its close proximity with the Bangladesh–India border, although the state of Bihar itself does not share any international borders with Bangladesh. The term gained popularity after the veteran RJD leader Mohammed Taslimuddin first proposed the creation of a separate Seemanchal state in 1992, during a period when he was a Member of Parliament representing Purnia on a Janata Dal ticket. The proposal included the districts of Kishanganj, Purnia, Araria, Katihar, and sometimes Bhagalpur, and Khagaria. The demand was based on Seemanchal’s distinct demography (high Muslim population) and overall socioeconomic backwardness of the region.
