= Maithili language =

Indo-Aryan language spoken in India and Nepal

Maithili
- 𑒧𑒻𑒟𑒱𑒪𑒲 𑂧𑂶𑂟𑂱𑂪𑂲 • 𑐩𑐿𑐠𑐶𑐮𑐷 • मैथिली
- Maithili in Tirhuta script
- Pronunciation: [ˈməi̯tʰɪliː]
- Native to: India and Nepal
- Region: Mithila
- Ethnicity: Maithil
- Native speakers: 75 million
- Language family: Indo-European: Indo-Iranian; Indo-Aryan; Eastern; Maithili
- Early forms: Magadhi Prakrit: Magadhan Apabhraṃśa; Abahattha
- Dialects: Thēthi-Maithili; Eastern Maithili; Angika-Maithili; Bajjika-Maithili; Sotipura-Maithili; Kochila Tharu; Mondarika-Maithili; Deogharia-Maithili; Jolaha-Maithili
- Writing system: Devanagari (Official); Tirhuta script (Historical and Original Script of Maithili language); Newar script (Historical); Kaithi script (Historical)

Official status
- Official language in: India; Jharkhand (additional); Nepal; Koshi Province; Madhesh Province
- Regulated by: Sahitya Akademi, Maithili Academy, Maithili - Bhojpuri Academy, Delhi, Nepal Academy

Language codes
- ISO 639-2: mai
- ISO 639-3: mai
- Glottolog: mait1250
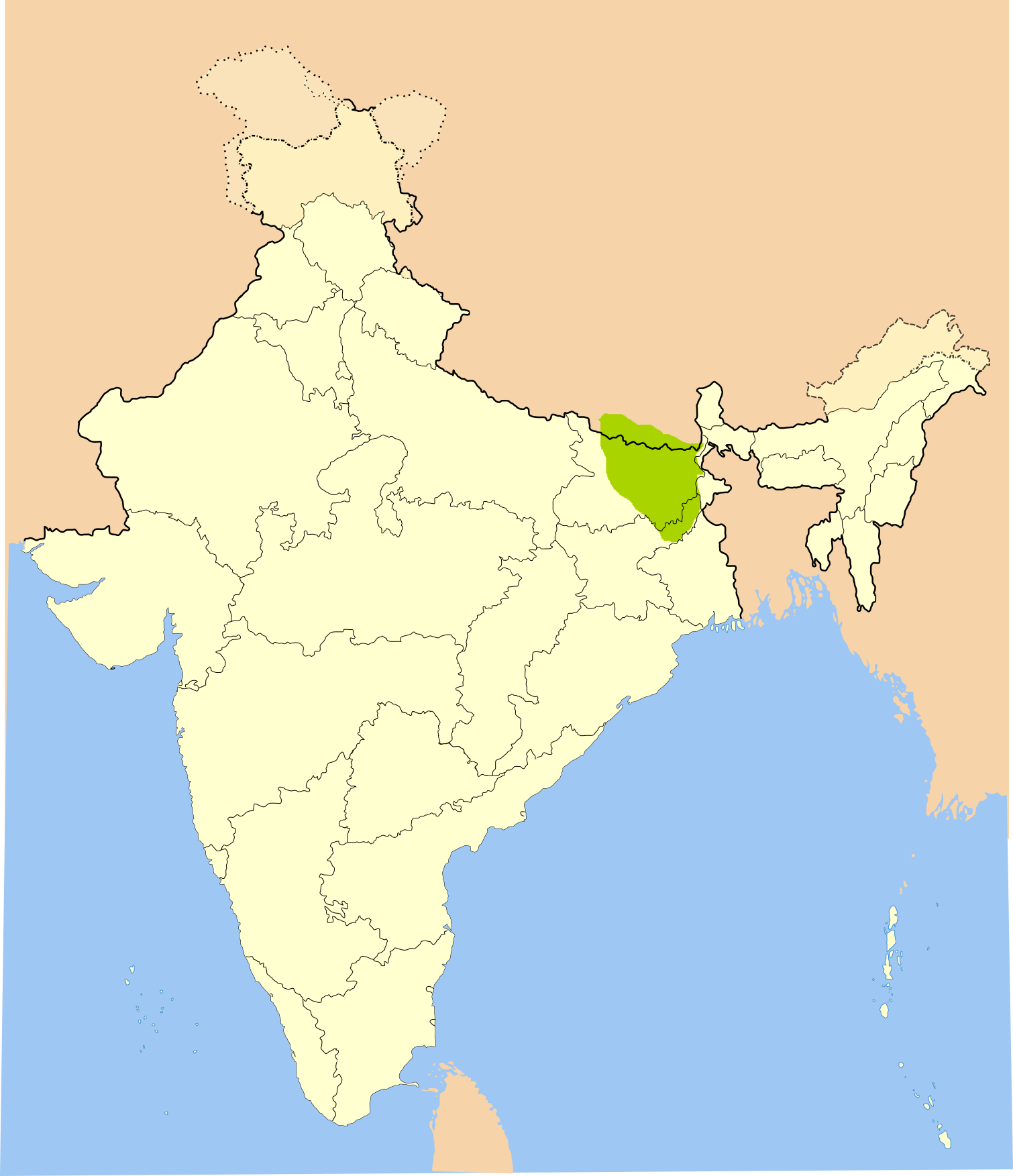
- Maithili-speaking region of India and Nepal

Maithili (Tirhuta: 𑒧𑒻𑒟𑒱𑒪𑒲, /ˈmaɪtɪli/ MY-til-ee, Maithili: [ˈməi̯tʰɪliː]) is an Indo-Aryan language spoken in parts of India and Nepal. It is native to the Mithila region, which encompasses parts of the eastern Indian states of Bihar and Jharkhand as well as Nepal's Koshi and Madhesh Provinces. It is one of the 22 scheduled languages of India. It is the second most commonly spoken native Nepalese language constitutionally registered as one of the fourteen provincial official languages of Nepal.

It is spoken by over 75 million people. The language is predominantly written in Devanagari this time, but Tirhuta script which is the historical and original script of Maithili, remains widely used today. The Indian government has stepped up efforts to bring the Tirhuta, the original script of Maithili language onto major digital platforms, including Google Keyboard and Android and iOS operating systems, in a move welcomed by linguists and language activists.

The Maithili language has been included in the CBSE curriculum without the Tirhuta script which is the original script of Maithili.

== Official status ==
In 2003, Maithili was included in the Eighth Schedule of the Indian Constitution as a recognised Indian language, which allows it to be used in education, government, and other official contexts in India. In March 2018, Maithili received the second official language status in the Indian state of Jharkhand.

Gopal Jee Thakur of the Bharatiya Janata Party is the first Member of Parliament, Lok Sabha who speaks in the Maithili language in the Parliament of India. He is currently the MP for Darbhanga.

The Nepalese Languages Commission has made Maithili an official Nepalese language used for administration in Koshi province and Madhesh Province.

On 26 November 2024, during the occasion of the Constitution Day, Maithili version of the Indian constitution was launched by the President of India Droupadi Murmu.

== Distribution ==
In India, it is mainly spoken in Darbhanga, Tirhut, Kosi, Purnia, Bhagalpur and Munger divisions of Bihar and in Santhal Pargana division of Jharkhand.

In Nepal, Maithili is spoken in Madhesh Province and Koshi Province.

Darbhanga, Madhubani, and Janakpur constitutes important cultural and linguistic centers of Maithili language.

== Classification ==
In 1870s, Beames considered Maithili a dialect of a Bengali. Hoernlé initially treated it as a dialect of Eastern Hindi, but after comparing it with the Gaudian languages, recognised that it shows more similarities with the Bengali language than with Hindi. Grierson recognised it as a distinct language, grouped under 'Bihari' and published its first grammar in 1881.

Chatterji grouped Maithili with the Magadhi Prakrit.

=== Dialects ===
Maithili varies greatly in dialects.

- Sotipura also called Central Maithili which is mainly spoken in Darbhanga, Madhubani, Supaul, Madhepura, Purnia, Samastipur, Araria and Saharsa districts of India and in Nepal it is spoken in Dhanusha, Mahottari, Siraha, Saptari, Sarlahi, Sunsari, and Morang districts.
- Bajjika dialect also known as Western Maithili is mainly spoken in Sitamarhi, Muzaffarpur, Vaishali and Sheohar districts of Bihar, India & Rautahat, and Sarlahi districts of Nepal. It is listed as a distinct language in Nepal and overlaps by 76–86% with Maithili dialects spoken in Dhanusa, Morang, Saptari and Sarlahi Districts.
- Maithili Language speakers in Madhesh Province, Nepal
  Thēthi dialect is spoken mainly in Munger division and Samastipur in Bihar and some adjoining districts of Nepal.
- Angika dialect (also known as Southern Maithili) is mainly spoken in and around Bhagalpur, Banka, Munger districts of Bihar and Godda, Sahebganj, Dumka and other districts of Jharkhand.
- Eastern Maithili or Purbi Maithili is a dialect of Maithili language, spoken primarily spoken in Kosi division and Purnia division in Mithila region of India.
- Mondarika Maithili spoken in Mandar Hill area which are Banka, Godda, Sahebganj and Pakur.
- Deogharia Maithili widely spoken in Deoghar District and Dumka.
- Kochila Tharu, a language spoken by the Tharu people in the districts of Saptari and Siraha as well as the adjoining areas. Some linguists have described it as a variety of Maithili.
- Maithili Language speakers in Koshi Province, Nepal
  Several other dialects of Maithili are spoken in India and Nepal, including Dehati, Deshi, Kisan, Bantar, Barmeli, Musar, Tati and Jolaha. All the dialects are intelligible to native Maithili speakers.

== Origin and history ==
The name Maithili is derived from the word Mithila, an ancient kingdom of which King Janaka was the ruler (see Ramayana). Maithili is also one of the names of Sita, the wife of King Rama and daughter of King Janaka.

Maithili Language speakers in Bihar

The beginning of Maithili language and literature can be traced back to the 'Charyapadas', a form of Buddhist mystical verses, composed during the period of 700-1300 AD. These padas were written in Sandhya bhasa by several Siddhas who belonged to Vajrayana Buddhism and were scattered throughout the territory of Assam, Bengal, Bihar and Odisha. Several of the Siddhas were from the Mithila region such as Kanhapa, Sarhapa etc. Scholars such as Rahul Sankrityanan, Subhadra Jha and Jayakant Mishra provided evidence and proved that the language of Charyapada has traces of ancient Maithili or proto Maithili. Apart from Charyapadas, there has been a rich tradition of folk culture, folk songs and which were popular among the common folks of the Mithila region.

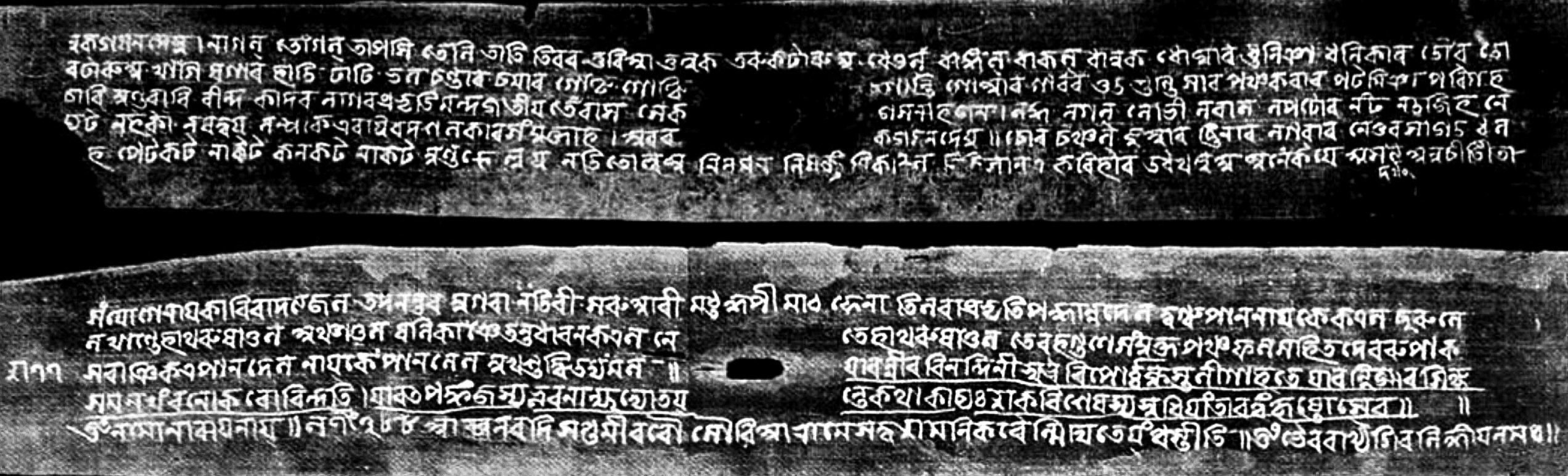
Manuscript of Varna Ratnakara, Tirhuta script.

After the fall of the Pala Empire, disappearance of Buddhism, establishment of the Karnat dynasty and patronage of Maithili under Harisimhadeva (1226–1324) of Karnāta dynasty dates back to the 14th century (around 1327 AD). Jyotirishwar Thakur (1280–1340) wrote a unique work Varna Ratnakara in Maithili prose. The Varṇa Ratnākara is the earliest known prose text, written by Jyotirishwar Thakur in Mithilakshar script, and is the first prose work not only in Maithili but in any modern Indian language.

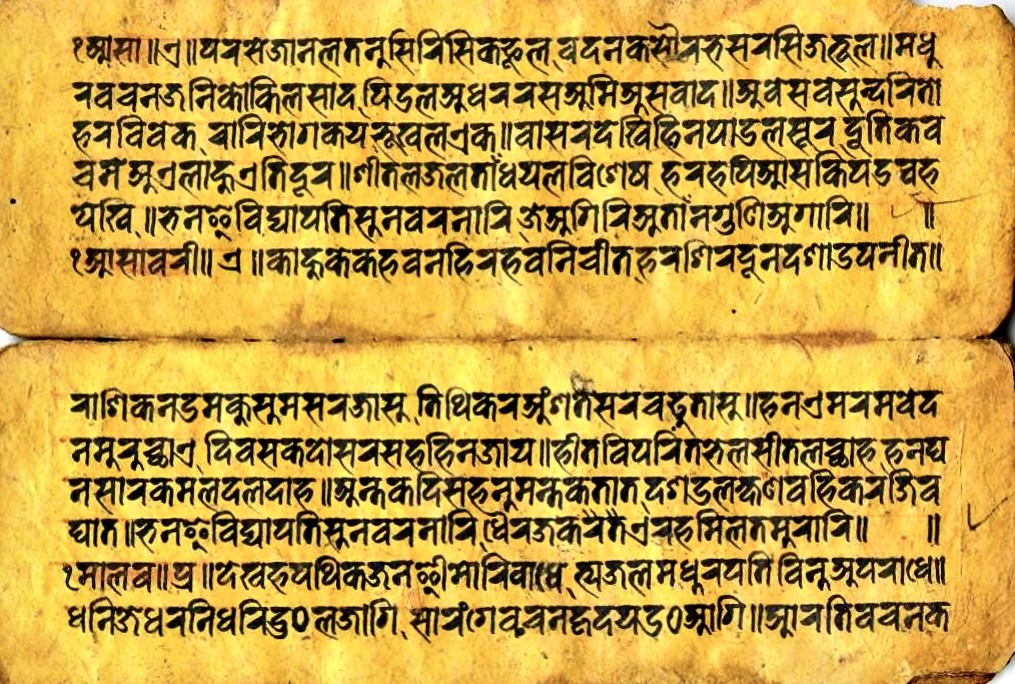
Manuscript of Maithili songs by Vidyapati, Newar script.

In 1324, Ghyasuddin Tughluq, the emperor of Delhi invaded Mithila, defeated Harisimhadeva, entrusted Mithila to his family priest and a great Military Scholar Kameshvar Jha, a Maithil Brahmin of the Oiniwar Dynasty. But the disturbed era did not produce any literature in Maithili until Vidyapati Thakur (1360 to 1450), who was an epoch-making poet under the patronage of Shiva Simha Singh and his queen Lakhimadevi. He produced over 1,000 immortal songs in Maithili on the theme of love of Radha and Krishna and the domestic life of Shiva and Parvati as well as on the subject of suffering of migrant labourers of Morang and their families; besides, he wrote a number of treaties in Sanskrit. His love-songs spread far and wide in no time and enchanted saints, poets and youth. Chaitanya Mahaprabhu saw the divine light of love behind these songs, and soon these songs became themes of Vaishnavism in Bengal. As a young man, Rabindranath Tagore, driven by curiosity and a spirit of experimentation, composed a series of poems in imitation of these songs under the pseudonym Bhanusimha. Vidyapati influenced the religious literature of Assam, Bengal, and Utkala Kingdom. The blending of languages during the later period gave rise to artificial literary dialects like Brajabuli in Bengal, and Brajavali in Assam.

The earliest reference to Maithili or Tirhutiya is in Amaduzzi's preface to Beligatti's Alphabetum Brammhanicum, published in 1771. This contains a list of Indian languages among which is 'Tourutiana.' Colebrooke's essay on the Sanskrit and Prakrit languages, written in 1801, was the first to describe Maithili as a distinct dialect.

Many devotional songs were written by Vaisnava saints, including in the mid-17th century, Vidyapati and Govindadas. Mapati Upadhyaya wrote a drama titled Pārijātaharaṇa in Maithili. Professional troupes, mostly from dalit classes known as Kirtanias, the singers of bhajan or devotional songs, started to perform this drama in public gatherings and the courts of the nobles. Lochana (c. 1575 – c. 1660) wrote Rāgatarangni, a significant treatise on the science of music, describing the rāgas, tālas, and lyrics prevalent in Mithila.

During the Malla dynasty's rule Maithili spread far and wide throughout Nepal from the 16th to the 17th century. During this period, at least seventy Maithili dramas were produced. In the drama Harishchandranrityam by Siddhinarayanadeva (1620–57), some characters speak pure colloquial Maithili, while others speak Bengali language, Sanskrit or Prakrit. One notable Malla King who patronised Maithili was Bhupatindra Malla who composed 26 plays in the Maithili language during his lifetime.

After the demise of Maheshwar Singh, the ruler of Darbhanga Raj, in 1860, the Raj was taken over by the British Raj as regent. The Darbhanga Raj returned to his successor, Maharaj Lakshmishvar Singh, in 1898. The Zamindari Raj had a lackadaisical approach toward Maithili. The use of Maithili language was revived through personal efforts of MM Parameshvar Mishra, Chanda Jha, Munshi Raghunandan Das and others.

Publication of Maithil Hita Sadhana (1905), Mithila Moda (1906), and Mithila Mihir (1908) further encouraged writers. The first social organisation, Maithil Mahasabha, was established in 1910 for the development of Mithila and Maithili. It blocked its membership for people outside of the Maithil Brahmin and Karna Kayastha castes. Maithil Mahasabha campaigned for the official recognition of Maithili as a regional language. Calcutta University recognised Maithili in 1917, and other universities followed suit.

Babu Bhola Lal Das wrote Maithili Grammar (Maithili Vyakaran). He edited a book Gadya Kusumanjali and edited a journal Maithili. In 1965, Maithili was officially accepted by Sahitya Academy, an organisation dedicated to the promotion of Indian literature.

In 2002, Maithili was recognised on the VIII schedule of the Indian Constitution as a major Indian language; Maithili is now one of the twenty-two Scheduled languages of India.

The publishing of Maithili books in Mithilakshar script was started by Acharya Ramlochan Saran.

== Demand of Classical Language status for Maithili ==
On 3 October 2024, the Union Government of India accorded additional five languages of India as the classical status. These additional five languages were Assamese, Bengali, Marathi, Pali and Prakrit. But due to the lack of proposal from the Bihar government, the Maithili language missed out the status of classical language in India. After the Union Cabinet's approval of classical language recognition for the additional five languages in India, the campaign for classical language status for Maithili gained renewed momentum. On 7 October 2024, JD(U) national working president cum Rajya Sabha MP Sanjay Jha raised the demand for classical language status to Maithili, through his social media handle.

== Phonology ==
=== Vowels ===
	Front		Central		Back	
	short	long	short	long	short	long
Close	ɪ ⟨इ⟩	iː ⟨ई⟩			ʊ ⟨उ⟩	uː ⟨ऊ⟩
Mid	e ⟨ऎ⟩	eː ⟨ए⟩	ə~ɐ ⟨अ⟩	əː ⟨अऽ⟩	o ⟨ऒ⟩	oː ⟨ओ⟩
Open	æ~ɛ ⟨ऍ⟩		a ⟨ॴ⟩	aː ⟨आ⟩	ɔ ⟨अ꣱⟩	
Diphthongs	əɪ̯ ⟨ऐ⟩ əe̯ ⟨ꣾ⟩				əʊ̯ ⟨औ⟩ əo̯ ⟨ॵ⟩	

- All vowels have nasal counterparts, represented by "~" in IPA and ँ on the vowels, like आँ ãː .
- All vowel sounds are realised as nasal when occurring before or after a nasal consonant.
- Sounds eː and oː are often replaced by diphthongs əɪ̯ and əʊ̯.
- ɔ is replaced by ə in northern dialects and by o in southernmost dialects.
- There are three short vowels that were described by Grierson, but are not counted by modern grammarians. But they could be understood as syllable break: ॳ /ɘ̆/, इ /ɪ̆/, उ /ʊ̆/ . Or as syllable break ऺ in Devanagari and "." in IPA.
- ꣾ is a Unicode letter in Devanagari, (IPA /əe̯/) which is not supported currently on several browsers and operating systems, along with its mātrā (vowel sign).

The following diphthongs are present:

अय़(ꣾ) /əe̯/ ~ /ɛː/ - अय़सन (ꣾ सन) /əe̯sən/ ~ /ɛːsɐn/ 'like this'
अव़(ॵ) /əo̯/ ~ /ɔː/- चव़मुख(चॏमुख) /tɕəo̯mʊkʰ/ ~ /tɕɔːmʊkʰ/ 'four faced'
अयॆ /əe̯/ - अयॆलाः /əe̯laːh/ 'came'
अवॊ (अऒ) /əo̯/ - अवॊताः /əo̯taːh/ 'will come'
आइ /aːi̯/ - आइ /aːi̯/ 'today'
आउ /aːu̯/ - आउ /aːu̯/ 'come please'
आयॆ (आऎ) /aːe̯/ - आयॆल /aːe̯l/ 'came'
आवॊ (आऒ) /aːo̯/ - आवॊब /aːo̯b/ 'will come'
यु (इउ) /iu̯/ - घ्यु /ɡʱiu̯/ 'ghee'
यॆ (इऎ) /ie̯/ - यॆः /ie̯h/ 'only this'
यॊ (इऒ) /io̯/ - कह्यो /kəhio̯/ 'any day'
वि (उइ) /ui̯/ - द्वि /dui̯/ 'two'
वॆ (उऎ) /ue̯/ - वॆ: /ue̯h/ 'only that'

A peculiar type of phonetic change is recently taking place in Maithili by way of epenthesis, i.e. backward transposition of final /i/ and /u/ in all sort of words. Thus:

Standard Colloquial - Common Pronunciation

अछि /ətɕʰi/ - अइछ /əitɕʰ/ 'is'
रवि /rəbi/ - रइब /rəib/ 'Sunday'
मधु /mədʱu/ - मउध /məudʱ/ 'honey'
बालु /ba:lu/ - बाउल /ba:ul/ 'sand'

=== Consonants ===
Maithili has four classes of stops, one class of affricate, which is generally treated as a stop series, related nasals, fricatives and approximant.

			Labial	Dental/ Alveolar	Retroflex	Palatal	Velar	Glottal
Nasal			m ⟨म⟩	n ⟨न⟩	ɳ ⟨ण⟩	(ɲ) ⟨ञ⟩	ŋ ⟨ङ⟩	
Plosive/ Affricate	voiceless	unaspirated	p ⟨प⟩	t ⟨त⟩	ʈ ⟨ट⟩	tɕ ⟨च⟩	k ⟨क⟩	
Plosive/ Affricate	voiceless	aspirated	pʰ ⟨फ⟩	tʰ ⟨थ⟩	ʈʰ ⟨ठ⟩	tɕʰ ⟨छ⟩	kʰ ⟨ख⟩	
Plosive/ Affricate	voiced	unaspirated	b ⟨ब⟩	d ⟨द⟩	ɖ ⟨ड⟩	dʑ ⟨ज⟩	ɡ ⟨ग⟩	
Plosive/ Affricate	voiced	aspirated	bʱ ⟨भ⟩	dʱ ⟨ध⟩	ɖʱ ⟨ढ⟩	dʑʱ ⟨झ⟩	ɡʱ ⟨घ⟩	
Fricative	voiceless		(ɸ~f) ⟨फ़⟩	s ⟨स⟩	(ʂ) ⟨ष⟩	(ɕ) ⟨श⟩	(x) ⟨ख़⟩	-(h)* ⟨ः⟩
Fricative	voiced			(z) ⟨ज़⟩		(ʑ) ⟨झ़⟩		ɦ ⟨ह⟩
Rhotic	unaspirated			ɾ~r ⟨र⟩	(ɽ) ⟨ड़⟩			
Rhotic	aspirated				(ɽʱ) ⟨ढ़⟩			
Lateral				l ⟨ल⟩				
Approximant			(ʋ~w) ⟨व⟩			(j) ⟨य⟩		

- Fricative sounds [ʂ, ɕ] only occur marginally, and are typically pronounced as a dental fricative /s/ in most styles of pronunciation. [h] ः is always added after a vowel.

==== Stops ====
There are four series of stops- bilabials, coronals, retroflex and velar, along with an affricate series. All of them show the four way contrast like most of the modern Indo-Aryan languages:

- tenuis, as /p/, which is like ⟨p⟩ in English spin
- voiced, as /b/, which is like ⟨b⟩ in English bin
- aspirated, as /pʰ/, which is like ⟨p⟩ in English pin, and
- murmured or aspirated voiced, as /bʱ/.

Apart from the retroflex series, all the rest four series show full phonological contrast in all positions. The retroflex tenius /ʈ/ and /ʈʰ/ show full contrast in all positions. /ɖ/ and /ɖʱ/ show phonological contrast mainly word-initially. Both are defective phonemes, occurring intervocalically and word finally only if preceded by a nasal consonant. Word finally and postvocalically, /ɖʱ/ surfaces as [ɽʱ~rʱ]. Non-initially, both are interchangeable with [ɽ~ɾ] and [ɽʱ~rʱ] respectively.

==== Fricatives ====
/s/ and /ɦ/ are most common fricatives. They show full phonological opposition. [ɕ], which is present in tatsama words, is replaced by /s/ most of the time, when independent, and prevocalic [ʂ] is replaced by /kʰ/, [x] or /s/. [ɕ] occurs before /tɕ/ and [ʂ] before /ʈ/. [x] and [f] occurs in Perso-Arabic loanwords, generally replaced by /kʰ/ and /pʰ/ respectively. [x] and [ɸ] also occurs in Sanskrit words (jihvamuliya and upadhmaniya), which is peculiar to Maithili.

==== Sonorants ====
/m/ and /n/ are present in all phonological positions. /ŋ/ occurs only non-initially and is followed by a homorganic stop, which may be deleted if voiced, which leads to the independent presence of /ŋ/. /ɳ/ occurs non-initially, followed by a homorganic stop, and is independent only in tatsama words, which is often replaced with /n/. [ɲ] occurs only non-initially and is followed by a homorganic stop always. It is the only nasal which does not occur independently.

- In most styles of pronunciation, the retroflex flap [ɽ] occurs marginally. It is usually pronounced as an alveolar tap [ɾ] sound, and is often interchanged with /r/.
- Approximant sounds [ʋ, w, j] and fricative sounds [ɸ, f, z, ɕ, ʑ, ʂ, x], mainly occur in words that are borrowed from Sanskrit or in words of Perso-Arabic origin. The conjunct ष्प (IAST ṣp) is pronounced [ɸp] in Maithili e.g. पुष्प [puɸp(ə)]. The conjunct ह्य (IAST hy) is pronounced [ɦʑ] as in ग्रऻह्य (grahya) [graɦʑə].

There are four non-syllabic vowels in Maithili- i̯, u̯, e̯, o̯ written in Devanagari as य़, व़, य़ॆ, व़ॊ. Most of the times, these are written without nukta.

== Morphology ==
=== Nouns ===
An example declension:

Case name	Singular Inflection			Plural Inflection		
Case name	Feminine	Masculine	Neuter	Feminine	Masculine	Neuter
Nominative	-इ ɪ	-आ/अ꣱ aː/ɔ		-इन ɪn	-अन, -अनि ən, ənɪ̆	-अन, -अनि ən, ənɪ̆
Accusative (Indefinite)	-ई iː	-आ/अ꣱ aː/ɔ		-ई iː	-आ aː	-अन, -अनि ən, ənɪ̆
Instrumental	Postposition used		-एँ ẽː	Postposition used		-अन्हि ənʰɪ̆
Dative	Postposition used					
Dative	-इल ɪlə	-अल ələ		No forms		
Ergative	-इएँ ɪẽː	-एँ ẽː		No forms		
Ablative	-इतः ɪtəh	-अतः ətəh		No forms		
Genitive	-इक ɪk, इर ɪr	-अक ək, -अर ər		-ईंक ĩːk	-आँँक ãːk	
Locative	Postposition used		-ए eː	Postposition used		-आँ ãː
Vocative	-इ ɪ/ई iː	-आ/अऽ aː/əː		-इन ɪn	-अन, -अनि ən, ənɪ̆	

=== Adjectives ===
The difference between adjectives and nouns is very minute in Maithili. However, there are marked adjectives there in Maithili.

	Masculine	Feminine	Neuter
Definite	-का/क꣱ kaː/kɔ	-कि/कि kɪ/kɪ̆	का/कऽ kaː/kəː
Indefinite	-आ/अ꣱ aː/ɔ	-इ/इ ɪ/ɪ̆	अ/अऽ ᵊ/əː

=== Pronouns ===
Pronouns in Maithili are declined in similar way to nominals, though in most pronouns the genitive case has a different form. The lower forms below are accusative and postpositional. The plurals are formed periphrastically.

Person		First Grade Honour	Honorofic	High Honorofic
First Person		हम ɦəm अपना ɐpᵊnaː (Inclusive)		
First Person		हमरा ɦəmᵊraː अपना ɐpᵊnaː (Inclusive)		
Second Person		तोँह tõːɦᵊ	अहाँ ɐɦãː	अपने ɐpᵊneː
Second Person		तोँहरा tõːɦᵊraː	अहाँ ɐɦãː	अपने ɐpᵊneː
Third Person	Proximate	ई iː	ए eː	
Third Person	Proximate	ऎकरा ekᵊraː	हिनका ɦɪnᵊkaː	
Third Person	Proximate	ए eː (Neuter)		
Third Person	Proximate	ऎहि, ऍ, अथि eɦɪ, æ, ɐtʰɪ (Neuter)		
Third Person	Non-Proximate	ऊ, वा uː, ʋaː	ओ oː	
Third Person	Non-Proximate	ऒकरा okᵊraː	हुनका ɦʊnᵊkaː	
Third Person	Non-Proximate	ऒ o (Neuter)		
Third Person	Non-Proximate	ऒहि, ॵ oɦɪ, əʊ (Neuter)		

== Orthography ==
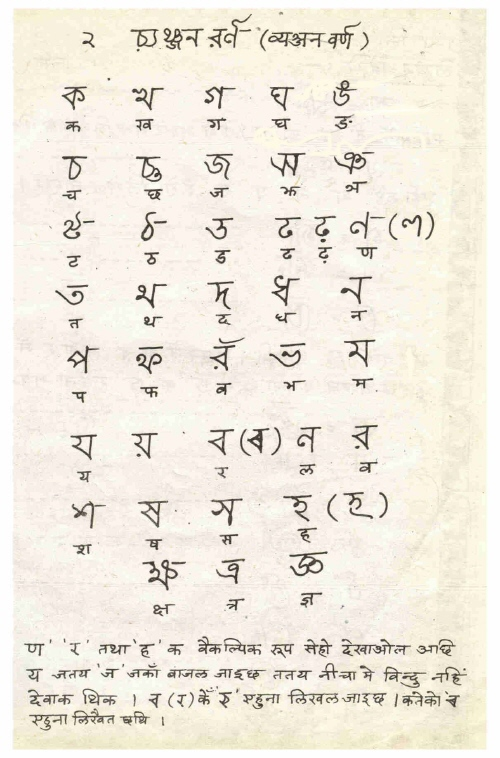
Consonants in Tirhuta script

Beginning in the 14th century, the language was written in the Tirhuta script (also known as Mithilakshara or Maithili), which is related to the Bengali-Assamese script. In Nepal, Newar script was used to write Maithili language. By the early 20th century, Tirhuta script was largely associated with the Mithila Brahmans, with most others using Kaithi, and Devanagari spreading under the influence of the scholars at Banaras. Throughout the course of the century, Devanagari grew in use eventually replacing the other two, and has since remained the dominant script for Maithili. Tirhuta retained some specific uses (on signage in north Bihar as well as in religious texts, genealogical records and letters), and has seen a resurgence of interest in the 21st century.

The Tirhuta and Kaithi scripts are both currently included in Unicode.

Consonants
Devanagari	Tirhuta		Transcription	
Devanagari	Image	Text	IAST	IPA
क		𑒏	ka	/kə/
ख		𑒐	kha	/kʰə/
ग		𑒑	ga	/gə/
घ		𑒒	gha	/gʱə/
ङ		𑒓	ṅa	/ŋə/
च		𑒔	ca	/t͡ɕə/
छ		𑒕	cha	/t͡ɕʰə/
ज		𑒖	ja	/d͡ʑə/
झ		𑒗	jha	/d͡ʑʱə/
ञ		𑒘	ña	(/ɲə/) /nə/ or /ẽ/
ट		𑒙	ṭa	/ʈə/
ठ		𑒚	ṭha	/ʈʰə/
ड		𑒛	ḍa	/ɖə/
ढ		𑒜	ḍha	/ɖʱə/
ण		𑒝	ṇa	/ɳə/ or /nə/
त		𑒞	ta	/t̪ə/
थ		𑒟	tha	/t̪ʰə/
द		𑒠	da	/d̪ə/
ध		𑒡	dha	/d̪ʱə/
न		𑒢	na	/nə/
प		𑒣	pa	/pə/
फ		𑒤	pha	/pʰə/
ब		𑒥	ba	/bə/
भ		𑒦	bha	/bʱə/
म		𑒧	ma	/mə/
य		𑒨	ya	(/jə/) /d͡ʑə/ or /e̯/
र		𑒩	ra	/rə/
ल		𑒪	la	/lə/
व		𑒫	va	(/ʋə/) or /bə/ /o̯/
श		𑒬	śa	(/ɕə/) /sə/
ष		𑒭	ṣa	/ʂə/ or /sə/ or /kʰə/
स		𑒮	sa	/sə/
ह		𑒯	ha	/ɦə/

Vowels
Devanagari		Tirhuta		Devanagari		Tirhuta		Transcription	
Independent				Dependent				Transcription	
Phonetic	Traditional	Image	Text	Phonetic	Traditional	Image	Text	Romanisation	IPA
अ			𑒁	(Note: Grierson and Hoernle used ◌॰ for pronounced schwa, and ◌• for the absent schwa in some of his works.)	(Note: Sometimes ◌' or even ◌ऽ is used for word final pronounced schwa, however not all of them are treated same, often only used to avoid confusion.)			a (Note: The notation ^{a} can be used for non-final weak schwa, Maithili weakens the non-final schwa, instead of deleting it (pronounced as /ə̆/). Grierson also used ^{a} for the purpose, but sometimes used apostrophe (') also for the purpose.)/∅ (Note: Final schwa is deleted in Maithili, though written in native scripts.)	/ə/ or /ɐ/ or /ə̆/ or ∅
अ꣱/अ^{ऽ}/अ'	अऽ (Note: In older texts, ◌꣱ or ः are used, not in current use though.)			◌꣱/◌^{ऽ}/◌'	◌' (Note: ◌' is used only word finally.)/ ◌ऽ			å	/ɔ/ ~/ʌ/
ॴ	आ		𑒂	ऻ	ा		𑒰	a/ă	/a/
आ			𑒂	ा			𑒰	ā	/аː/
इ			𑒃	ि			𑒱	і	/ɪ/
not possible in initial position or independent (after vowel)				ि' (Note: Grierson used ि् .)	ि		𑒱	ĭ/^{i}	/ɪ̆/
ई			𑒄	ी			𑒲	ī	/іː/
उ			𑒅	ु			𑒳	u	/ʊ/
not possible in initial position (after vowel)				ु' (Note: Grierson used ु् .)	ु		𑒳	ŭ/^{u}	/ʊ̆/
ऊ			𑒆	ू			𑒴	ū	/uː/
ऋ			𑒇	ृ			𑒵	ṛ	/r̩/ or /rɪ/
ॠ			𑒈	ॄ			𑒶	ṝ	/r̩ː/ or /riː/
ऌ			𑒉	ॢ			𑒷	ḷ	/l̩/ or /lɪ/
ऍ	ऍ/ऐ			ॅ (Note: Occurrence of æ~ɛ is a recent phenomenon.)	ॅ/ै			æ/ê	/æ/ ~/ɛ/
ऎ	ए			ॆ	े		𑒺	e	/е/
ए			𑒋	े			𑒹	ē	/еː/
ꣾ	ऐ		𑒌	◌ꣿ	ै		𑒻	ai	/ai/
ऐ			𑒌	ै			𑒻	āі	/аːі/
ऒ	ओ			ॊ	ो		𑒽	о	/о/
ओ			𑒍	ो			𑒼	ō	/оː/
ॵ	औ		𑒎	ॏ	ौ		𑒾	au	/au/
औ			𑒎	ौ			𑒾	āu	/aːu/

== Sample Text ==
The following sample text is Maithili translation of Article 1 of the Universal Declaration of Human Rights:

Maithili in the Tirhuta alphabet

𑒁𑒢𑒳𑒔𑓂𑒕𑒹𑒠 𑓑: 𑒮𑒦 𑒧𑒰𑒢𑒫 𑒖𑒢𑓂𑒧𑒞𑓁 𑒮𑓂𑒫𑒞𑒢𑓂𑒞𑓂𑒩 𑒁𑒕𑒱 𑒞𑒟𑒰 𑒑𑒩𑒱𑒧𑒰 𑒂 𑒁𑒡𑒱𑒏𑒰𑒩𑒧𑒹 𑒮𑒧𑒰𑒢 𑒁𑒕𑒱। 𑒮𑒦𑒏𑒹𑒿 𑒁𑒣𑒢–𑒁𑒣𑒢 𑒥𑒳𑒠𑓂𑒡𑒱 𑒂 𑒫𑒱𑒫𑒹𑒏 𑒕𑒻𑒏 𑒂𑒍𑒩 𑒮𑒦𑒏𑒹𑒿 𑒋𑒏 𑒠𑒼𑒮𑒩𑒏 𑒣𑓂𑒩𑒞𑒱 𑒮𑒾𑒯𑒰𑒩𑓂𑒠𑒣𑒴𑒩𑓂𑒝 𑒫𑓂𑒨𑒫𑒯𑒰𑒩 𑒏𑒩𑒥𑒰𑒏 𑒔𑒰𑒯𑒲।

Maithili in the Devanagari alphabet

अनुच्छेद १: सभ मानव जन्मतः स्वतन्त्र अछि' तथा गरिमा आ अधिकारमे समान अछि'। सभकेँ अपन–अपन बुद्धि आ विवेक छैक आऒर सभकेँ एक दॊसराक प्रति सौहार्दपूर्ण व्यवहार करबाक चाही।

Roman transliteration of Maithili

Anucchēd^{a} Ēk^{a}: Sabh^{a} mānab^{a} janmataḥ svatantra ach^{i} tathā garimā ā adhikār^{a}mē samān^{a} ach^{i}. Sabh^{a}kē̃ apan^{a}-apan^{a} buddhi ā bibek^{a} chaik^{a} āor^{a} sabh^{a}kē̃ ek^{a} dos^{a}rāk^{a} prati sauhārdapūrṇa byabahār^{a} kar^{a}bāk^{a} cāhī.

Translation

Article 1: All human beings are born free and equal in dignity and rights. They possess conscience and reason. Therefore, everyone should act in a spirit of brotherhood towards each other.

== See also ==
- Languages with official status in India
- List of Indian languages by total speakers
- Maithili Cinema
- Maithili music
- Mithila culture
- Daak Vachan
