= Dhamdaha =

Town in Bihar, India

- Town
- Location within Bihar Location within India
- Coordinates: 25°44′22″N 87°09′03″E
- Country: India
- State: Bihar
- Region: Mithila
- District: Purnia
- Block: Dhamdaha
- Elevation: 39 m (128 ft)

Population (2011)
  - Total: 37,987
- Time zone: UTC+5:30 (IST)
- PIN: 854205

Dhamdaha is a town and the administrative Block in Purnia District, Bihar, India. It is situated in the Eastern part of Bihar, about 26 kilometres southwest of Purnia. In the year 2011, the village has a total population of 37,987.

== Geography ==
Dhamdaha borders Hanumani Chakla to the north, Rupaspur Khagha to the east, Tarauni Milik to the south, and Chandrahi to the west. Bihar State Highway 65 runs east–west through the village. The average elevation is at 39 metres above the sea level.

== Climate ==
Dhamdaha has a Humid Subtropical Climate (Cwa). It sees the most rainfall in July, with an average precipitation of 384 mm; and the least amount of rainfall in November, with an average precipitation of 6 mm.

Climate data for Dhamdaha
Month	Jan	Feb	Mar	Apr	May	Jun	Jul	Aug	Sep	Oct	Nov	Dec	Year
Mean daily maximum °C (°F)	22.8 (73.0)	26.3 (79.3)	32 (90)	35.2 (95.4)	33.9 (93.0)	32.6 (90.7)	31.3 (88.3)	31.4 (88.5)	30.8 (87.4)	29.7 (85.5)	27.7 (81.9)	24.4 (75.9)	29.8 (85.7)
Daily mean °C (°F)	16.8 (62.2)	20.1 (68.2)	25.4 (77.7)	28.8 (83.8)	28.8 (83.8)	28.7 (83.7)	28.1 (82.6)	28.1 (82.6)	27.4 (81.3)	25.6 (78.1)	22.2 (72.0)	18.5 (65.3)	24.9 (76.8)
Mean daily minimum °C (°F)	11.2 (52.2)	13.9 (57.0)	18.6 (65.5)	22.6 (72.7)	24.1 (75.4)	25.4 (77.7)	25.7 (78.3)	25.7 (78.3)	24.8 (76.6)	21.7 (71.1)	16.7 (62.1)	12.9 (55.2)	20.3 (68.5)
Average rainfall mm (inches)	13 (0.5)	17 (0.7)	21 (0.8)	44 (1.7)	155 (6.1)	301 (11.9)	384 (15.1)	347 (13.7)	293 (11.5)	100 (3.9)	6 (0.2)	6 (0.2)	1,687 (66.3)
Source: Climate-Data.org

== Demographics ==
In the year 2011, Dhamdaha has a total of 7,616 households. Out of the 37,987 inhabitants, 19,928 are male and 18,059 are female. The total literacy rate is 48.46%, with 10,957 of the male population and 7,453 of the female population being literate.
