= 2022 Bihar Caste-Based Survey =

2023 Survey in Bihar, India

- January 2023 - August 2023
- Seal of Bihar

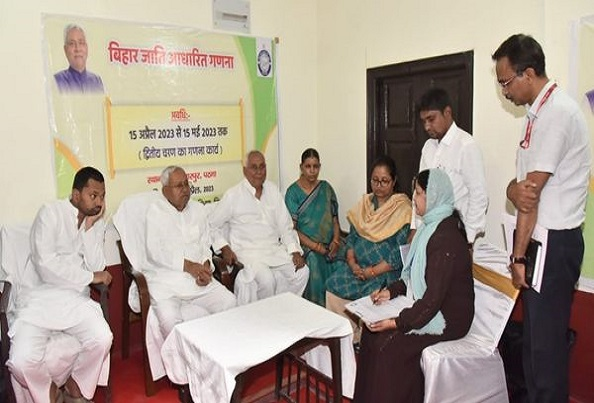
- Chief Minister Nitish Kumar inaugurating caste based census in 2023

General information
- Region: Bihar
- Authority: Government of Bihar

Results
- Total population: 130,725,310
- Religion: 81.99% Hinduism; 17.70% Islam; 0.08% Buddhism; 0.06% Christianity; 0.01% Jainism; 0.01% Sikhism; 0.13% Others
- General Communities: 20,291,679 (15.52%)
- Other Backward Classes: 82,544,450 (63.14%)
- Scheduled Castes: 25,689,820 (19.65%)
- Scheduled Tribes: 2,199,361 (1.68%)

The 2022 Bihar Caste-Based Survey was notified by the Government of Bihar on 6 June 2022 by gazette notification after a Supreme Court ruling. The survey was conducted in two phases, house listing and caste and economic enumeration. The data collection for the survey began on 7 January 2023 and the data was released on 2 October 2023. The responsibility to conduct the survey was given to the General Administration Department (GAD) of the Government of Bihar. The government planned to collect the data digitally by mobile application named Bijaga- Bihar Jaati Adharit Ganana. BELTRON (Bihar State Electronics Development Corporation Ltd.), a Government of Bihar agency provided IT support, hiring the services of Maharashtra-based private firm Trigyn Technologies to develop the mobile app.

The Bihar government spent nearly ₹5 billion rupees in this work from its contingency fund (Bihar Aakasmikta Nidhi). Apart from government employees, Anganwadi workers and Jeevika Didi also worked to complete the survey till given target of May 2023. A portal was prepared for caste-based enumeration in Bihar. The digital work for caste-based enumeration in Bihar was entrusted to a Delhi-based company Trigyn Technologies. The survey counted the 214 castes on Bihar government list. According to the list, 22 were counted in Scheduled Castes, 32 in Scheduled Tribes, 30 in Backward Classes, 113 in Extremely Backward Classes and 7 in Upper Castes.

== First phase ==
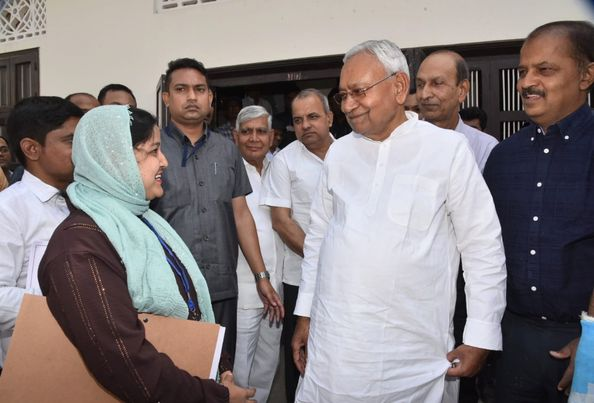
Nitish Kumar in conversation with the officials conducting the caste based survey, in his ancestral town Bakhtiarpur on 15 April 2023

The first phase of the caste-based survey started in Bihar from January 7, 2023, and ended on January 21. The number of all households in the State were counted and recorded in the first phase. The second phase will be calculated on the basis of the data of the first phase. All the data collected in the first phase is uploaded on this portal and these data will be available to the enumerators and supervisors at the time of second enumeration on the mobile app. In the first phase of caste census, census workers reached about 25,890,497 families across Bihar in 38 districts, which have 534 blocks and 261 urban local bodies and numbered the houses. In the first phase, the name of the head of the family and the number of members living there were recorded. More than 518,000 personnel were engaged in the caste census of the first phase which began on January 7. A survey of 1.435 million families was done in the district of Patna, left out families can give information to District Caste Enumeration Cell.

== Second phase ==
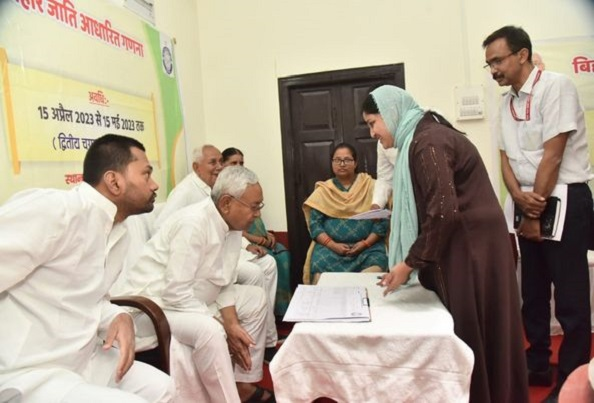
Chief Minister of Bihar, Nitish Kumar inaugurating the second phase of the caste based survey on 15 April 2023, from his ancestral village, Bakhtiarpur

In second phase of the survey, which started on April 15, 2023, and ended on May 15, 2023, people living in the households, their castes, sub-castes, and socio-economic conditions etc., were collected. The survey ended on May 31, 2023. In this phase, over 304,000 enumerators asked respondents 17 questions, including caste. Every enumerator has been given a target to reach out to 150 households. While all 17 questions are mandatory, filling Aadhaar number, caste certificate number and ration card number of the head of the family, are optional. Bihar government has set different codes for 215 different castes of the state. The sub-categories of a particular caste concerned have been merged into one single social entity, and they have one numerical caste code for use during the month-long second phase of caste-based headcount. At the same time, there will be special strictness regarding the registration of names in this phase. If someone tries to write the name twice, now the app will mark such people. The names of people living outside the state will also be registered.

On 15 April 2023, Nitish Kumar launched 2nd phase of caste-based survey from his ancestral home at Bakhtiyarpur. Newborns born from January 22, 2023, till the end of the second phase are not counted. Nitish Kumar informed that once the data work is completed, the report of the caste-based survey would be tabled in the Bihar Vidhan Sabha and the Bihar Vidhan Parishad. After that the report would be made public. The work of the second phase of counting will be done from April 15 to May 15, 2023, in all 261 urban local bodies and 534 blocks. On August 16, 2023, the data entry work of the caste-based census was completed.

List of 17 questions in second phase
S.no	Question
1	Full name of family member
2	Father's / husband's name
3	Relation to the head of the family
4	Age (in years)
5	Gender
6	Marital status
7	Religion
8	Caste
9	Temporary migration status (place of work or study, whether within or outside state, country or abroad)
10	Educational qualifications (pre-primary to post master's degree)
11	Profession (ranges from government to private job in organised or unorganised sector, self-employed, farmer [owner of farm land], agricultural labourer, construction labourer, other labourer, skilled labourer, beggar, rag-picker, student, housewife to those having no work)
12	Ownership of computer/laptop (with or without internet connectivity)
13	Motor vehicle (two-wheeler, three-wheeler, four-wheeler, six-wheeler or more, tractor)
14	Agricultural land (area from 0-50 decimals to 5 acres and above)
15	Residential land (area from 5 decimals land to 20 decimals and above; flat owner in a multi-storied apartment)
16	Monthly income from all sources(ranging from a minimum 0- ₹ 6,000 to a maximum ₹ 50,000 and above)
17	Residential condition (pucca/thatched house, hutment or homeless)

== Anecdote and protests ==
In April 2023, there was an incident during the caste census; around 40 women in a red-light area of Ward No. 7 in Bihar's Arwal district declared a man named Roopchand as their husband. Some of them even mentioned name Roopchand as their father's name and children's name. When questioned, it was found that Roopchand is not a man. The people of this area call money as Roopchand.

In some places such as Masaurhi and Dhanarua in Patna district, members of Lohar (blacksmith) community boycotted the caste survey saying that Bihar Government wants to categorise it under either Lohra/Lohara or Kamar (carpenter) caste.

== Legal battle ==
On 20 January 2023, the Supreme Court of India refused to entertain various pleas challenging Bihar Government's notification to conduct caste-based census in Bihar. The pleas against caste-based survey were filed by many petitioners, including Youth For Equality group. Chief Minister of Bihar Nitish Kumar said that the exercise is not caste census, instead its a caste survey. On 4 May 2023, Patna High Court stayed the caste-based survey in its interim order, and directed the state government to keep the survey data, collected so far preserved till the next date of hearing (July 3, 2023). Government of Bihar informed Patna High Court that 80% of the "survey" was completed. Patna High court asked questions on 11 points from Bihar government in its interim order. Government of Bihar countered that a central law, Collection of Statistics Act, 2008 empowers state government to carry out all kinds of censuses and surveys, including for caste. On 7 July 2023, Patna High court reserved its verdict after hearing a total of 8 PIL pleas challenging various aspects of the survey. On 1 August 2023, Patna High Court gave judgement that holding caste survey in Bihar is valid and legal. A division bench comprising Chief Justice K. Vinod Chandran and Justice Partha Sarathy passed the order in its 101-page verdict, while dismissing all petitions challenging survey. The second phase of Bihar's caste-based survey resumed on 2 August 2023. On 21 August 2023, Patna High Court disposed of a writ petition, submitted by Reshma Prasad, seeking deletion of transgender people from caste list, and stated that transgender individuals can make representations to Government of Bihar to not be considered as a caste. Government of Bihar had filed a counter affidavit to this plea, informing the court that this anomaly was rectified on 25 April 2023 by instructing the enumerators to have three options for gender.

On 21 August 2023, Supreme Court of India bench comprising Justices Sanjiv Khanna and SVN Bhatti asked Central Government to provide a response within seven days regarding the survey's potential consequences and subsequently scheduled the matter for resumed hearing on 28 August 2023. Union Home Ministry filed affidavit in Supreme Court that Census Act allows only Central government to conduct census and actions like a census. Later in evening, it backtracked from its previous affidavit and filed a fresh affidavit claiming that the paragraph "inadverdently crept in". Government of Bihar reiterated its previously stated position that the Collection of Statistics Act, 2008, empowers it to conduct such an enumeration exercise in the interest of social justice. On 6 September 2023, Supreme Court of India bench of justices Sanjiv Khanna and SVN Bhatti posted the matter to October 3 and clarified that it had not granted any stay on the publication of the survey. On 6 October 2023, Supreme Court of India refused to issue any interim directive to restrain Government of Bihar from releasing more caste-census data, and listed the next hearing in the matter in January 2024. On 2 January 2024, Supreme Court of India asked Bihar government to release the break-up of the caste survey data in the public domain, and listed the next hearing in the matter on 5 February 2024.

The findings of the survey increased the overall reservation to 65%, which was eventually struck down by the Patna High Court on 20 June 2024.

== Survey report ==
Primary Survey Abstract
Category	Community		Reservation	Total households	Total population	Household monthly income						Education																Employment		
Category	Community		Reservation	Total households	Total population	less than 6,000		6,000 – 10,000	10,000 – 20,000	20,000 – 50,000	above 50,000	1 to 5		6 to 10		11 to 12		Diploma		Graduate		Post Graduate		Doctorate/CA		Illiterate		Govt. job		Organised Pvt. job
Category	Hindu (Note: includes Budhhist, Jain, Sikh, Christian and others)	Muslim	Reservation	Total households	Total population	Actual num.	pct.	pct.	pct.	pct.	pct.	Actual num.	pct.	Actual num.	pct.	Actual num.	pct.	Actual num.	pct.	Actual num.	pct.	Actual num.	pct.	Actual num.	pct.	Actual num.	pct.	Actual num.	pct.	pct.
General	4	3	10%^{*}	4,328,282 (15.64%)	20,291,679 (15.52%)	1,085,913	25.09%	23.98%	19.27%	16.95%	9.86%	3,509,576	17.45%	6,410,968	31.88%	2,813,515	13.99%	233,297	1.16%	2,921,947	14.53%	502,704	2.5%	50,377	0.25%	3,666,823	18.23%	641,281	3.16%	3.49%
BC	30	4	12%	7,473,529 (27.01%)	35,463,936 (27.13%)	2,477,970	33.16%	29.35%	18.42%	10.67%	4.22%	7,692,304	21.69%	10,760,570	30.34%	3,790,586	10.69%	236,493	0.67%	2,533,580	7.14%	287,969	0.81%	25,284	0.07%	10,137,150	28.58%	621,481	1.75%	1.13%
EBC	82	31	18%	9,884,904 (35.73%)	47,080,514 (36.01%)	3,319,509	33.58%	32.56%	18.82%	8.32%	2.28%	11,607,532	24.65%	13,743,637	29.19%	3,742,137	7.95%	200,060	0.42%	2,090,749	4.44%	203,328	0.43%	14,143	0.03%	15,478,928	32.88%		0.98%	0.73%
SC	22	—N/a	16%	5,472,024 (19.78%)	25,689,820 (19.65%)	2,349,111	42.93%	29.44%	15.32%	5.9%	1.72%	6,246,358	24.31%	6,393,393	24.89%	1,480,345	5.76%	72,256	0.28%	805,420	3.14%	72,267	0.28%	4,353	0.02%	10,615,428	41.32%		1.13%	0.51%
ST	32		1%	470,256 (1.7%)	2,199,361 (1.68%)	200,809	42.7%	25.8%	16.97%	8%	2.53%	539,222	24.52%	600,825	27.32%	164,555	7.48%	8,636	0.39%	77,871	3.54%	5,980	0.27%	505	0.02%	801,767	36.45%	30,164	1.37%	0.68%
Unspecified	1		—N/a	39,935 (0.14%)		9,474	23.72%	22.9%	18.7%	17.0%	12.5%	33,431	18.32%	54,637	29.94%	21,008	11.51%	2,014	1.1%	26,500	14.52%	4,452	2.44%	736	0.4%	39,694	21.75%			
State	215		50% (Note: Bihar has reservations of 16% for Scheduled Castes, 1% for Scheduled Tribes, and 30% for Other Backward Classes (12% for Backward Classes, 18% for Extremely Backward Classes). Women in OBCs have an additional 3% reservation. With the 103rd Constitution (Amendment) Act, 2019, 10% reservation for Economically Weaker Sections in the Unreserved (General) category was introduced, increasing the total reservation in Bihar from 50% to 60%.)	27,668,930	130,725,310	9,442,786	34.13%	29.61%	18.06%	9.83%	3.9%	29,628,423	22.66%	37,964,030	29.04%	12,012,146	9.19%	752,756	0.58%	8,456,067	6.47%	1,076,700	0.82%	95,398	0.07%	40,739,790	31.16%	2,049,370	1.57%	1.22%

=== Caste group wise population ===
Category-wise distribution of social groups.
1. Extremely Backward Classes (36.0%)
2. Backward Classes (27.1%)
3. Scheduled Castes (19.6%)
4. Forward Castes (15.5%)
5. Scheduled Tribes (1.68%)

The 2022 Bihar caste-based survey report, released on October 2, 2023, reveals a total population of 130,725,310. Among them, 35,463,936 (27.12%) belong to Backward Classes (BCs), 47,080,514 (36.01%) belong to Extremely Backward Classes (EBCs), collectively constituting 82,544,450 (63.14%) of Other Backward Classes (OBCs). Additionally, 25,689,820 (19.65%) belong to Scheduled Castes (SCs), 2,199,361 (1.68%) belong to Scheduled Tribes (STs), and 20,291,679 (15.52%) belong to the Unreserved (General) communities. Among the 214 (excluding one category, "Others", which enumerates people who do not belong to any of the predefined 214 community list) surveyed communities, around 190 castes have a population of less than one percent. The survey also indicates that Hindus make up 81.99%, Islam 17.70%, Buddhism 0.08%, Christianity 0.06%, Jainism 0.01%, Sikhism 0.01%, and 0.13% adhere to other unclassified religious beliefs.

Population by religion

Hinduism - 81.99 %
Islam - 17.70 %
Buddhism - 0.08 %
Christianity - 0.06 %
Jainism, Sikhism and Other religious beliefs - 0.17 %

Statistical data for the major social groups
Caste	State Category	Population	Percentage
Yadav (Ahir, Gowala, Gora, Ghasi, Mehar and Sadgop)	BC	18,650,119	14.2666%
Dushadh (Dhari, Dharahi)	SC	6,943,000	5.3111%
Ravidas (Mochi, Ravidas, Rohidas, Charmkar)	SC	6,869,664	5.255%
Kushwaha (Koeri)	OBC	5,506,113	4.212%
Shaikh (caste) (Muslim)	BC	4,995,897	3.8217%
Brahmin	Gen.	4,781,280	3.6575%
Momin (Muslim)/Julaha/Ansari (Muslim)	OBC	4,634,245	3.545%
Rajput	Gen.	4,510,733	3.4505%
Musahar	EBC	4,035,787	3.0872%
Kurmi	OBC	3,762,969	2.8785%
Bhumihar	Gen.	3,750,886	2.8693%
Teli		3,677,491	2.8131%
Mallah (Nishad)		3,410,093	2.6086%
Bania (Sudhi, Modak/Mamas, Roniyar, Pansari, Modi, Karora, Kesharvani, Thathera, Kalwar (Kalal/Iraqi), (Vigahut Kalwar), Kamlapuri Vaishya, Mahuri Vaishya, Bangi Vaishya (Bangali Baniya), Baranwal Vaishya, Agrahari Vaishya, Vaishya Poddar, Kasaudhan, Gandhbanik, Batham Vaishya, Goldar (East/Wesh Champaran)		3,026,912	2.3155%
Kanu		2,892,761	2.2129%
Dhanuk		2,796,605	2.1393%
Nonia		2,498,474	1.9112%
Surjapuri Muslim (except Sheikh, Syed, Mullick, Mughal, Pathan) (Muslim)		2,446,212	1.8713%
Pan, Sawasi, Panar		2,228,343	1.7046%
Nai		2,082,048	1.5927%
Chandravanshi (Kahar, Kamkar)		2,055,644	1.5725%
Barhai (carpenter)		1,895,672	1.4501%
Dhuniya (Muslim)		1,888,192	1.4444%
Kumhar (Prajapati)		1,834,418	1.4033%
Rayeen or Kunjra (Muslim)		1,828,584	1.3988%
Shershahbadi (Muslim)		1,302,644	0.9965%
Pasi		1,288,031	0.9853%
Bind		1,285,358	0.9833%
Kulhaiya (Muslim)		1,253,781	0.9591%
Bhuiya		1,174,460	0.8984%
Dhobi (Rajak)		1,096,158	0.8385%
Pathan (Khan) (Muslim)		986,665	0.7548%
Sonar		893,276	0.6833%
Kayastha		785,771	0.6011%
Sai/Faqeer/Diwan/Madar (Muslim)		663,197	0.5073%
Gangota (Gangaputra)		648,493	0.4961%
Barai, Tamoli, Chaurasiya		616,092	0.4713%
Beldar (Hindu)		483,554	0.3699%
Dhobi (Muslim)		409,796	0.3135%
Pal (Bhedihar, Gaderi, Gaderiya)		363,529	0.2781%
Mali		349,285	0.2672%
Dangi		336,629	0.2575%
Idrisi or Darzi (Muslim)		329,661	0.2522%
Syed (Muslim)		297,975	0.2279%
Dom, Dhangadh, Bansfor, Dharikar, Dharkar, Domra		263,512	0.2016%
Hari Mehtar, Bhangi		255,582	0.1955%
Rajbhar		224,722	0.1719%
Chudihar (Muslim)		207,914	0.159%
Thakurai (Muslim)		147,482	0.1128%
Qasab (Qasai) (Muslim)		133,807	0.1024%
Mullick (Muslim)		111,655	0.0854%
Nat		105,358	0.0806%
Bhat (Muslim)		89,052	0.0681%
Madariya (Only for Sanhaul block of Bhagalpur and Dhoriya block of Banka) (Muslim)		86,658	0.0663%
Daphali (Muslim)		73,259	0.056%
Mehtar, Lalbegi, Halalkhor, Bhangi (Muslim)		69,914	0.0535%
Morshikar(Muslim)		66,607	0.051%
Pamaria (Muslim)		64,890	0.0496%
Nat (Muslim)		61,629	0.0471%
Gaddi (Muslim)		57,617	0.0441%
Mukairi (Muslim)		56,522	0.0432%
Cheeq (Muslim)		50,404	0.0386%
Jat (Madhubani, Darbhanga, Sitamadhi, Khagaria & Araria) (Muslim)		44,949	0.0344%
Rangrez (Muslim)		43,347	0.0332%
Bakho (Muslim)		36,830	0.0282%
Bhathiyara (Muslim)		27,263	0.0209%
Sainthwar		20,505	0.0157%
Saikalgarg (Muslim)		18,936	0.0145%
Qadar (Muslim)		18,121	0.0139%
Miriyasin (Muslim)		15,415	0.0118%
Nalband (Muslim)		11,900	0.0091%
Christian Convert (EBC)		11,506	0.0088%
Madari (Muslim)		11,620	0.0089%
Abdal (Muslim)		11,433	0.0087%
Christian Convert (Harijan)		9,708	0.0074%
Itfarosh/Itafarosh/Gadheri/Itpaz Ibrahimi (Muslim)		9,462	0.0072%
Qalandar (Muslim)		7,873	0.006%
Qaghzi (Muslim)		2,360	0.0018%
Shekhra		1,904	0.7648%

=== Key findings ===
- 34.13% of the households in the states were identified as poor, earning less than ₹ 6,000 per month. Among them, 42.93% were Scheduled Castes, 42.7% were Scheduled Tribes, 33.58% were Extremely Backward Classes, 33.16% were Backward Castes, and 25.09% were from General Categories.
- 4% of the households in the states earn more than ₹50,000 per month. This group includes 9.86% of the General Category members, 2.28% of the Extremely Backward Classes members, and 1.72% of the Scheduled Castes members.
- 16.73% of the state population work as laborers, 7.70% are engaged in the agricultural sector, and 3.05% are self-employed. Government jobs are held by 1.57%, and 3.36% work in the private sector. Within the private sector, 1.22% are employed in the organized sector, and 2.14% work in the unorganized sector.
- 2,049,000 (i.e., 1.5%) state's population have government employment. 3.19% of individuals from the General Category, 1.37% from Scheduled Tribes, 1.13% from Scheduled Castes, and 0.98% from Extremely Backward Classes are employed in government employment in their respective categories.
- In the state, 22.67% completed primary education, 14.33% reached secondary level, 14.71% attained high school education, and 6.47% hold graduate degrees.
- Among the graduates, 14.54% belong to General Categories, 9.14% to backward classes, 4.44% to Extremely Backward Classes, 3.12% to Scheduled Castes, and 3.53% to Scheduled Tribes.
- 95.49% of state's population do not possess any vehicles.
- Among the well-off Hindu upper caste, the numerically minuscule Kayasthas is most well-off.

=== Socio-economic status of castes ===
The Other Backward Class category has played pivotal role in politics of Bihar and their socio-economic status changed remarkably after the Mandal Politics of 1990s. This category also holds significant position in social and economic life of state. Analysis of the survey report by some news reports showed that the prominent OBC castes, Yadav, Koeri, Kurmi and Bania were the biggest beneficiary in the post mandal politics of Backward Castes. They also improved their socio-economic status and remained significant holders of government jobs. It was also found that Yadavs with biggest share in population of state at 14.26%, were less represented in government jobs in proportion of their population. In their comparison, two other prominent castes Koeri and Kurmi were better represented. The Koeri and Kurmis with much smaller population size were also found to be in better socio-economic condition. It was opined that this was a consequence of better position of Koeri and Kurmis in land ownership and educational progress.

Table of employment among significant social groups
Caste	Category	Number of people in government jobs	Percentage of population in government jobs
Yadav	Other Backward Caste	289,538	1.55%
Kushwaha (Koeri)	Other Backward Caste	112,106	2.04%
Kurmi	Other Backward Caste	117,171	3.11%
Bhumihar	Forward Caste	187,256	4.9%
Rajput	Forward Caste	171,933	3.81%
Brahmin	Forward Caste	172,259	3.60%
Kayastha	Forward Caste	52,490	6.68%
Paswan (Dusadh)	Schedule Caste	99,230	1.44%
Ravidas (Chamar)	Schedule Caste	82,290	1.20%
Dhobi	Schedule Caste	34,372	3.14%
Pasi	Schedule Caste	25,754	2%
Musahar	Schedule Caste	10,615	0.26%
Bania (Sudhi, Modak/Mayra, Rauniyar, Pansari, Modi, Kasera, Thathera, Kalwar/Kalal/Eki, Kamalapuri Vaishya, Mahuri Vaishya, Bangi Vaishya, Baranwal Vaishya, Kesharvani, Agrahari Vaishya, Vaishya Poddar, Kasaudhan, Gandhvanik, Batham Vaishya, Goldar)	Other Backward Caste	59,286	1.96%
Teli	Extremely Backward Caste	53,056	1.44%
Kanu	Extremely Backward Caste	34,404	1.19%
Dhanuk	Extremely Backward Caste	33,337	1.19%
Kahar (Chandravanshi)	Extremely Backward Caste	31,200	1.45%
Nai	Extremely Backward Caste	28,756	1.38%
Barhai	Extremely Backward Caste	20,279	1.07%
Mallaah	Extremely Backward Caste	14,100	0.41%
Nonia	Extremely Backward Caste	14,226	0.57%
Sheikh	Forward Caste	39,595	0.7%

As per the survey, 95.49% of the people in Bihar do not own any vehicle. This means out of the total population of the state, 12,48,00,000 people do not own any vehicle.

- Around 3.80% people of Bihar own two-wheeler vehicles. In absolute figures, there are 49,62,000 two wheelers owned by Biharis.

Communities having significant ownership of two-wheeler vehicles in Bihar	Number of two-wheelers owned
Yadav	761,014
Kushwaha (Koeri)	300,686
Kurmi	191,224
Brahmin	321,335
Bhumihar	278,716
Rajput	312,395
Bania	203,411
Kayastha	84,515

- According to survey, only 0.13% people own a tractor in Bihar. In absolute figures the number of tractor owners stands at 167,062.

Communities having significant ownership of tractors in Bihar	Number of tractors owned
Yadav	51,975
Kushwaha (Koeri)	12,428
Kurmi	7,170
Brahmin	13,315
Bhumihar	12,014
Rajput	12,031
Bania	3,558
Kayastha	642

- The owners of three wheeler vehicles comprised 0.11% of the population of Bihar. In numerical terms they made up 142,689 people.

Communities having significant ownership of three-wheeler vehicles in Bihar	Number of three-wheelers owned
Yadav	24,765
Kushwaha (Koeri)	6,571
Kurmi	4,552
Brahmin	6,704
Bhumihar	5,109
Rajput	6,149
Bania	5,376
Kayastha	1,340

== Reactions to Caste Survey Report ==
The caste survey figure, however, were challenged by many politicians of the state. It was alleged that the population of certain castes were inflated while the population of others were underrepresented in the survey. Prominent Schedule Caste leader of state, Chirag Paswan accused that it was done in order to reap political gains. It was widely believed that population of Kushwaha caste was underrepresented in the survey. The president of Rashtriya Lok Janata Dal, Upendra Kushwaha also claimed that the figures are unreliable as the sub-caste of Kushwaha community like Dangis were counted as a separate entity.

During the process of caste data collection itself, officials of General Administration department (GAD) informed that some people can be left out of survey, as survey is a sub-set of census and cannot be expected to have 100% coverage. On 5 October 2023, BJP MP from Patna Sahib Ravi Shankar Prasad said that no one met him or his family to collect their caste information and implied that the survey data was manipulated to suit RJD. Information and Public Relations Department, Bihar countered this allegation saying his and his family's data was collected as per norm. Tejashwi Yadav remarked that if caste data was to be altered, Nitish Kumar would have exaggerated the numbers of his own Kurmi caste.

The revealing of numbers of various caste groups also brought the discussion about political representation of various castes on fore. The discussion about castes of Members of Bihar Legislative Assembly and the Members of Parliament from Bihar were done for the sake of finding out representation of largest social group of Bihar called Extremely Backward Castes, whose numbers turned out to be approximately 36% in the caste survey. Several reports revealed that forward castes were overrepresented in the number of legislators from Bihar contrary to their minute share in population. The Hindu Forward Castes, who made up nearly 10% percent of the population of the state had 64 Member of Legislative Assembly in 243 membered house in the 2020 to 2025 Assembly period. It was found that among the Forward Castes, Rajputs had seven Member of Parliament out of 40 Lok Sabha members from Bihar, making them grossly overrepresented. Yadav caste also had large share in number of legislators in State Assembly and they made up 52 out of 243 MLAs. In the state legislative assembly, among the Forward Castes, Rajputs had 28 legislators, which was grossly disproportionate to their population, which was pegged at approximately 3.4 percent. A study after 2020 Bihar Legislative Assembly elections found that most of the Forward Caste legislators were elected on the symbol of Bharatiya Janata Party, which distributed 52 out of 110 seats it contested to Forward Castes.

== Follow-up on the report ==
On 9 November 2023, Bihar Assembly Passed Bill For 65% Caste Quota excluding 10% EWS Quota, in government jobs and educational institutions. The new reservation quota percentages include 20% for Scheduled Castes, 2% for Scheduled Tribes, 18% for Backward Classes, 25% for Extremely Backward Classes, and 10% for the economically weaker section among the Upper Castes. The existing 3% reservation for BC women was scrapped. Bihar Government issued gazette notifications for raising the quota to 75% after Governor Rajendra Arlekar gave his assent to two bills. The two bills were notified as - The Bihar Reservation of Vacancies in Posts and Services (For Scheduled Castes, Scheduled Tribes and Other Backward Classes) (Amendment) Act 2023, and The Bihar (In Admission in Educational Institutions) Reservation (Amendment) Act 2023.

On 20 June 2024, Patna High Court struck down 65 per cent reservation cap in government jobs and educational institutions.

== See also ==
- Demographics of Bihar
- Biharis
- Other Backward Class
- Reservation in India
- 2011 Socio Economic and Caste Census
- 2015 Karnataka Socio-Economic and Education Survey
- 2023 Odisha Socially and Educationally Backward Classes Survey
- 2024 Andhra Pradesh Comprehensive Caste Survey
- 2024 Telangana Social Educational Employment Economic Caste Survey
