= Luv-Kush equation =

Political term used in Bihar, India

The Luv-Kush equation is a political term used in the context of the politics of Bihar, to denote the alliance of the agricultural Kurmi and the Koeri caste, which was assumed to be approximately 15% of the state's population (7% approximately in the Bihar caste-based survey 2022) The alliance of these two caste groups has remained the support base of Nitish Kumar, as against the MY equation of Lalu Prasad Yadav, which constitutes Muslims and the Yadavs. Caste consciousness and the quest for political representation largely drive the politics of Bihar. The political alliance of the Koeri and the Kurmi castes, termed the "Luv-Kush equation" was formed when a massive Kurmi Chetna Rally (Kurmi consciousness rally) was organised by members of the Kurmi community in 1994 against the alleged casteist politics of Lalu Yadav, who was blamed by contemporary community leaders for promoting Yadavs in politics and administration.

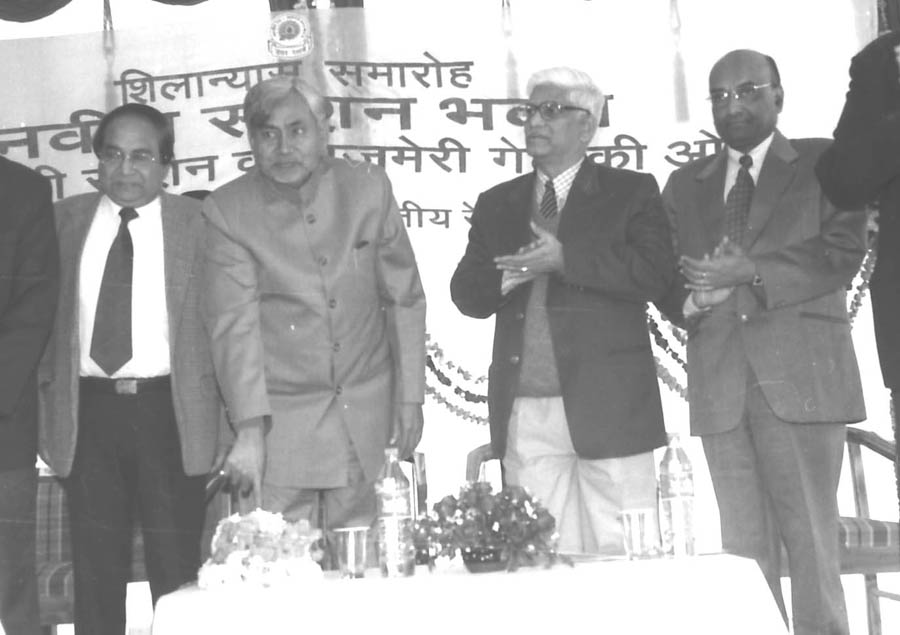
Union Minister for Railways Nitish Kumar unveiling a plaque for foundation of a new station building at the Ajmeri Gate entry of New Delhi railway station in New Delhi on 25 January 2004

Unlike the Yadavs, the Kushwahas (Koeris), who are traditionally a farming community, are very like the Kurmis with whom they have a better social alliance than with the Yadavs. Since the 1990s, Nitish Kumar had garnered the support of a number of Kushwaha leaders including Shakuni Choudhury, Nagmani, Tulsidas Mehta and Upendra Kushwaha. The call for unity between the two castes by Kumar in the 1990s gave rise to the new social alliance and a new term in the political lexicon of Bihar.

== Etymology ==
The Backward Castes in Bihar are divided into two Annexures. While the Annexure-I castes are socio-economically more backward and are also called Extremely Backward Castes, the castes included in Annexure-II are comparatively prosperous. Annexure-I contains approximately 113 caste groups, while there are only four caste groups in Annexure-II: Koeri, Kurmi, Bania and the Yadav. The Yadav make up the single largest caste group in Bihar, followed by Koeris, who comprise 4.2% of the state's population. The Kurmi make up 2.86% of the state's population and are concentrated around Nalanda, Patna and a few pockets of central Bihar. The Koeris, who are more numerous than the Kurmis, are distributed more heterogeneously across Munger, Banka, Khagaria, Samastipur, East Champaran, West Champaran and Bhojpur district.

The Koeris were basically vegetable growing farmers, unlike the Kurmis, who grow staple crops and food grains. The Koeris claim descent from the mythological Hindu deity Kusha, a son of Rama, an incarnation of lord Vishnu. The Kumis claim their descent from Kusha's twin brother, Lava. Pseudo-historical facts were used to forge an alliance between the two caste groups in 1993, when Nitish Kumar, earlier an ally of Lalu Prasad Yadav, caused a split in his political party to form his own Samata Party.

In the 1930s, the three numerically important caste groups of Bihar: Yadav, Kurmi and the Koeri formed a political party called the Triveni Sangh to challenge the over-representation of the Forward Castes in politics. From 1990, the political scenario in the state changed and led to the fall of the upper castes from power. They were now replaced by the upwardly mobile backward caste groups, like these three agricultural castes. This led to the formation of a Yadav dominated state government in the 1990s under Lalu Prasad Yadav. It had the support of the other two caste groups, which together constituted the Triveni Sangh. According to political theorists of Bihar, the Yadav, though numerically superior, fell behind the Kushwaha (Koeri) and the Kurmis in terms of education and in other spheres of life. This caused dissension between them, and the latter refused to accept the leadership of the Yadavs. Nitish Kumar is said to have utilised this dissension in the early 1990s to break the hold of Lalu Prasad Yadav over a section of the Backward Castes.

Despite having a cultivator background, the twin castes of the Koeri and the Kurmi have many differences. The Kurmis had manned key bureaucratic positions in the 1960s and 70s and have remained far ahead of other backward castes, both socio-economically and educationally. The Koeris have remained comparatively backward, much like the Yadavs. The socio-economic ascendancy of the Kurmis led them to join the ranks of landlords. Consequently, they were involved in the formation of a private army called the Bhumi Sena, which was known for perpetrating massacres of the Dalits and other atrocities. In contrast, the Koeris have always remained at the forefront in the battle of weaker sections against the landlords. Jagdeo Prasad was a well-known Koeri leader, noted for championing the cause of the lower strata of society.

== Alliance ==
=== 1990–2000 ===
After Lalu Yadav had assumed the premiership of the Bihar as a leader of the Janata Dal in 1990, he took several bold steps, which were welcomed by the downtrodden communities. There was strong support for the Yadav's government from the Other Backward Class (OBC) Yadav community to which he belonged and from Muslims. They saw in him a saviour after the arrest of Lal Krishna Advani, the Bharatiya Janata Party leader, in Samastipur. He was undertaking a massive Ram Rath Yatra, which was polarising the state along religious lines. He also revised the Karpoori Formula, a scheme drawn up by former chief minister Karpoori Thakur, which provided three per cent of government jobs and educational institutions were reserved for members of the Forward Castes and a separate three per cent for women. These went to upper castes, in case suitable women candidates could not be found. Yadav abolished the upper-caste quota and reduced the women's quota to two per cent. Four per cent of the extracted quota from this rearrangement was distributed equally among both the Extremely Backward Class and the Upper Backward Castes.

During this period, Yadav's charismatic personality led him to believe he was the sole leader in Janta Dal. To an extent this was true, given his hold over the poor and rural people of Bihar and the lower castes and the minorities. Yadav sidelined other leaders, and the party witnessed a period of dominance by his fellow caste men. The dominance of Yadav's people from the cadres to the higher party positions at the cost of other aspirational backward castes created dissension in their ranks. The growing face-offs led to a split in the Janata Dal in 1994, when Nitish Kumar and George Fernandes formed the Samata Party, which was supported by the other leaders of the Koeri and the Kurmi castes. In the 1995 elections to the Bihar Legislative Assembly, there were two rival factions, one dominated by the Yadavs under the leadership of Lalu Prasad, and the other dominated by the Koeri-Kurmi community. In the 1996 general election to the Lok Sabha, the Samata Party formed an alliance with the Bharatiya Janata Party, which was popular among the upper caste and urban population of the Bihar. The Samta Party's performance in the 1995 elections for the Bihar Assembly was poor. It won only seven seats, while the Bharatiya Janata Party emerged as the main opposition party against the Janata Dal with 41 seats. Lalu Prasad emerged victorious with Janata Dal getting 167 seats. The only impact of the Nitish Kumar factor was the loss of some votes of the Koeri-Kurmi community, while the lower caste supported the Janta Dal firmly.

After the 1995 elections, the upper-caste alliance with the Koeri-Kurmi community was strengthened around the common question of challenging the dominance of the Yadav caste and Lalu Prasad, who allegedly made insulting comments against them in the 1995 election campaign. The Kurmi Chetna Rally, which led to cultivation of alliance between the upwardly mobile Koeri and the Kurmi castes, was preceded by other caste-based rallies, which were organised by other caste groups like the Nishad, and the Dhanuk, motivated to flaunt the might of their respective castes. Senior leaders of various political parties often addressed these rallies to garner support from the castes.

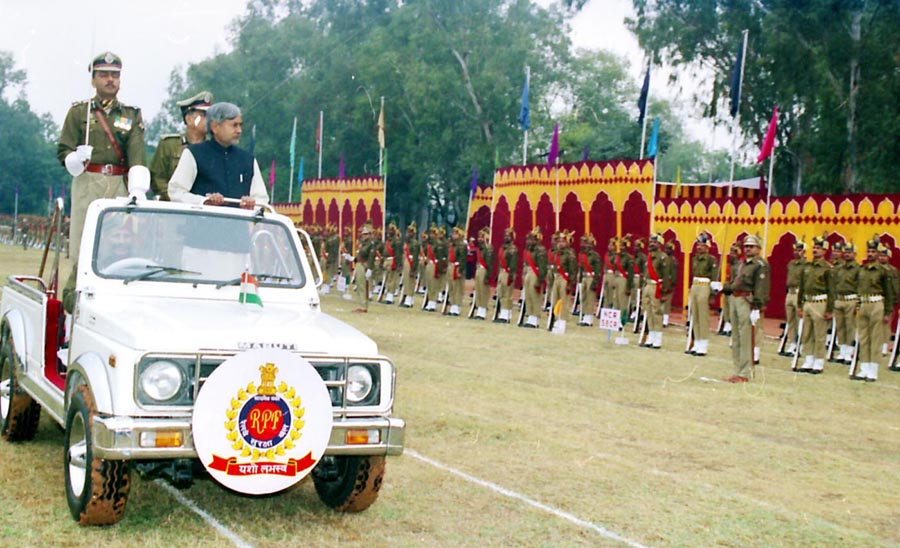
Nitish Kumar as the Railway Minister inspecting the Guard of Honour at the Investiture Parade of Railway Protection Force (RPF) in Delhi on 16 December 2003

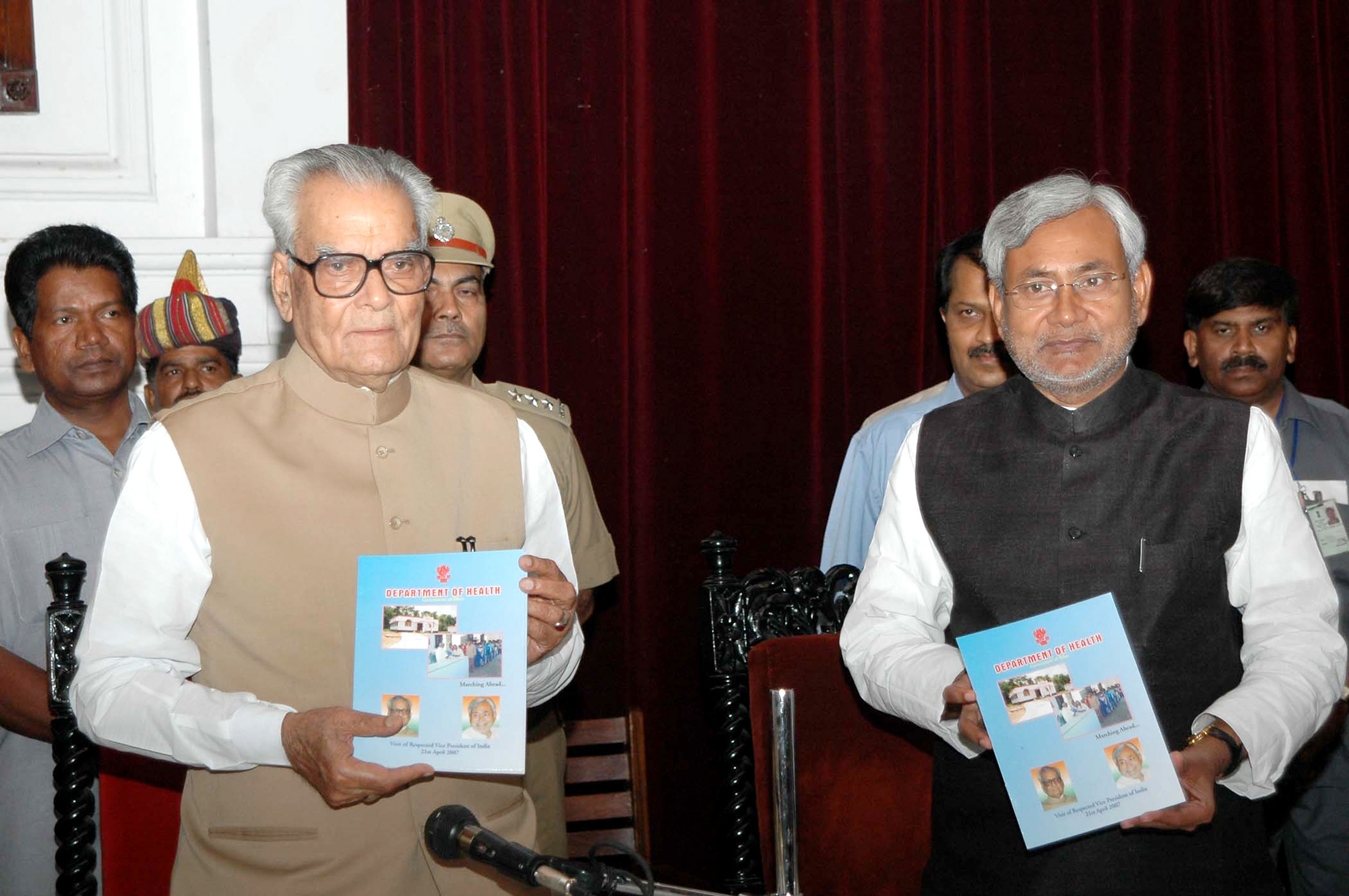
Nitish Kumar with Vice President Bhairon Singh Shekhawat releasing a commemorative booklet on Free Drug Distribution in Patna, Bihar on 21 April 2007

=== Background to the Kurmi Chetna Rally (1994) ===
"The Kurmis must step forward to take the leadership of the social justice movement.
No power on earth can deny job reservations to Kurmis....They (Kurmis) need to form a broader coalition with the OBCS and EBCs for their own political survival"

— Excerpt from Nitish Kumar's speech at the rally

The Kurmi Chetna Rally (transl. Kurmi consciousness rally) was a historic movement in the politics of Bihar, which led to the formation of new caste coalitions and the degradation of the Yadav caste dominance under Lalu Yadav. The rally was the brainchild of some of the non-notable community leaders, and the aim was nonpolitical. It was being seen by the community leaders as a forum to raise political consciousness among community members under the banner of "All India Kurmi Kshatriya Mahasabha". Some leaders of the Kurmi community like Satish Kumar, who organised the event, found it difficult to get the consent of Nitish Kumar, who was reluctant to attend the great rally. He was concerned public support for it was unclear and it could be a failure. Some leaders who were amongst the coordinators of this event also revealed later that the Bhumihars, a caste which opposed Lalu Prasad during his political ascendency, were supporting the rally implicitly. The organisers used the posters of national level leaders like Uma Bharti and Sharad Pawar, but the day preceding the organization of the main event, Nitish Kumar issued a statement against it and refused to attend.

Kumar had been critical of Yadav's policies. Some gave influential Yadavs high-value government contracts and other opportunities which came with the administrative apparatus. Relatives of Lalu Prasad, including his brothers-in-law Sadhu Yadav and Subhash Prasad Yadav, took the lead in high-value business with the support of government. In 1993, at a memorial ceremony for Karpoori Thakur, Nitish warned Yadav against these policies which undermined the interests of non-Yadav OBCs, but no solution was found. Sankarshan Thakur, who wrote the biography of Nitish Kumar, wrote:

At a memorial function on Karpoori Thakur’s anniversary in 1993, he cautioned the Laloo government against ignoring the Bihar-specific amendments the late leader had proposed to the Mandal formula—the lesser privileged backward communities, or the extremely backward communities (EBCs) as they came to be known, must have a quota within the reservation quota, else they would continue to languish. Laloo paid no attention. On the contrary, he let flourish conspiratorial speculation that Kurmis and Koeris would be taken off the quota list. But the more he ignored and irked non-Yadav backwards, the shriller they turned on him. The lead was taken by Kurmis and Koeris, the most assertive and numerically powerful groups among non-Yadav backwards.

According to Sankarshan Thakur, there was an explicit indication from the Lalu Prasad that any step taken by Kumar to support or join the rally would result in his expulsion from the party, which Kumar understood. Hence, he hesitated even after being invited by other community leaders who had gathered at the Gandhi Maidan. Earlier, it was thought the public and even the Kurmi community were not paying any attention to the rally. This proved to be wrong. On the day of the rally, many Kurmi caste men gathered at the Gandhi Maidan. In his hesitation whether to attend the rally, Kumar stopped at the residence of Vijay Krishna, a leader and an erstwhile ally of Lalu Prasad Yadav, who had resigned from his ministry after a few skirmishes over their ideological differences with Yadav.

Krishna realised the only way to pose a political challenge to Yadav was by harnessing the votes of the disgruntled Kurmi community. After a long discussion, Krishna got Kumar's consent, and the decision was made to speak directly against the Janata Dal and Lalu Prasad Yadav. After defending Yadav for some time, Kumar talked about the over-representation of some castes at the cost of others and put forward his anti-government feelings to the mob. Reiterating his words, he asked the crowd to reject such a government, which was not conscious of the rights of its own people. The leaders gathering at this rally also appealed for the alliance of the Kurmi and the Koeri castes. The roti-beti relationship (sharing of food and daughter) between the two was also proposed to consolidate the ties.

=== Electoral performance of the Samata Party (1994–2005) ===
The Samata Party, which came into existence after the Kurmi Chetna Rally, was the new rival front and principal opponent of the Lalu Yadav-led Janata Dal party. Members of the Koeri and Kurmi castes dominated it, and it came to be known as the "party of Koeri-Kurmi". The 1995 elections in Bihar witnessed a complete marginalisation of the forward castes from Bihar's political scene. The two chief rival fronts contesting the elections were the Janata Dal with its allies, led by Yadavs, and the Samta Party, led by the leaders of the Koeri and Kurmi communities under the leadership of Lalu's former partner, Nitish Kumar. The pre-election scenario was one of confusion over the alliance and partnership with the Indian National Congress (INC) and the Bharatiya Janata Party (BJP) contesting individually, while the Samata Party was aligned only to the Communist Party of India (Marxist–Leninist) (CPI (ML)). The Janata Dal under Lalu was aligned with its traditional partners like the Jharkhand Mukti Morcha, CPI and CPM.

=== Beginning of the post-Mandal era (2005 elections) ===
In the 2005 assembly elections in Bihar, the National Democratic Alliance (NDA) obtained a majority of seats, winning 144 of 243 seats. Nitish Kumar, who had ambitions for the chief ministerial post, was elected as the new chief minister by the NDA leadership. After becoming leader, Nitish gave adequate representation to the Extremely Backward Castes (EBC) by including them in his ministry. In the Lalu-Rabri era, the representation of the EBC was only 2.1% in government, which climbed to 15% of the cabinet during this period. The elections of 2005 also witnessed the highest ever representation among the winning candidates of the Koeri and Kurmi castes, who constituted the core of the Janata Dal (United) electorate. The twin castes benefited most from the victory of the JD(U)-led NDA. The JD(U) had been formed as a result of the merger of the Samata Party with the Sharad Yadav faction of the Janata Dal, and had allied with the BJP to replace Rashtriya Janata Dal, the new name of Lalu Prasad's party, which had broken away from the Janata Dal to emerge as a separate entity. The coming to power of the National Democratic Alliance government in Bihar did not challenge the monopoly of the OBCs in the politics of Bihar. Christophe Jaffrelot points to the phenomenon of a further strengthening of OBCs at the forefront of Bihari politics.

== Alliance after 2010 ==
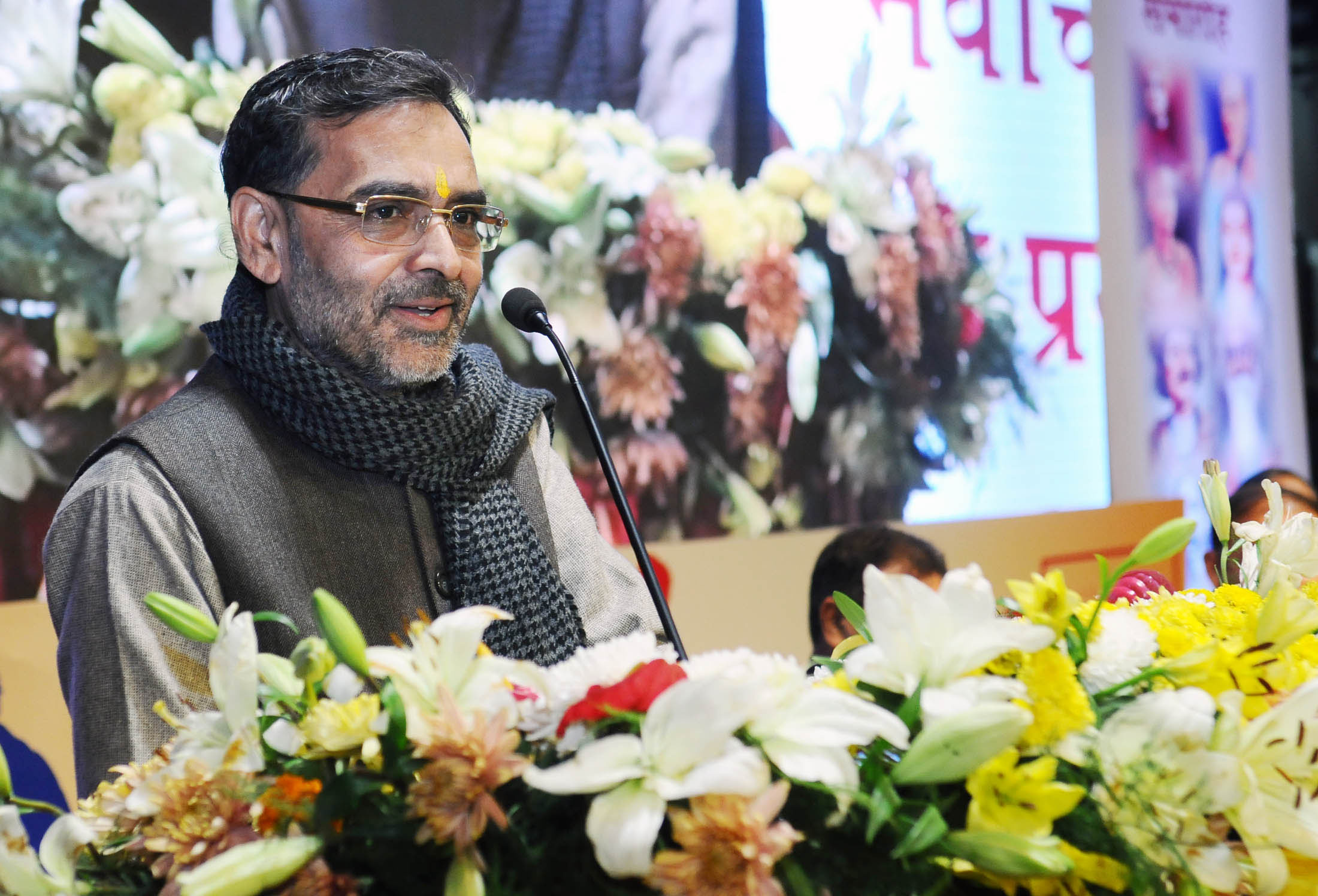
Minister of State for Human Resource Development Upendra Kushwaha addressing at the Kendriya Vidyalaya Sangathan (KVS) foundation day event in New Delhi on 15 December 2016

In later years, the politics of the state remained caste driven but with the emergence of multi-polar fronts. The new parties, which were formed in a later period, commanded the loyalty of specific caste groups represented by the senior leaders of the party. Ram Vilas Paswan emerged as the leader of the Dalits with his Lok Janshakti Party. The upper caste, who by now had become the core supporters of the BJP, cultivated an alliance with the Koeri-Kurmi community, which had remained the core supporters of the JD(U) against the Rashtriya Janata Dal (RJD) and constituted the bedrock of the ruling NDA.

By 2010, Nitish had cultivated an alliance with many Koeri leaders. For instance, the newly elected member of Legislative Assembly from the Jandaha constituency, Upendra Kushwaha, was promoted against all odds. In 2004, when the Samata Party merged with JD(U) to make it the largest opposition party in Bihar, Kushwaha was promoted as leader of the opposition. However, the ambitious Kushwaha caused a split in the party to form his own Rashtriya Samata Party in 2007. The poor electoral performance by this newly formed party made Kushwaha merge once again with the parent JD(U) in 2009. This time, the disgruntled Kushwaha was sent to Rajya Sabha by the JD(U) to gain his confidence. Though, Kushwaha had remained an old partner of Nitish and had been with him from the time of Jayaprakash Narayan, only to make his electoral debut in 2000, in 2013, he caused a split in JD(U) again and floated his Rashtriya Lok Samata Party.

Considering the hold of Upendra Kushwaha on the Koeri caste, the Bharatiya Janata Party allied with him for the 2014 General elections to the Lok Sabha. The elections proved to be an eye-opener for the other parties in the state. With the help of its new allies, BJP was successful in forming a new voter base in the state. The Kurmi community support, which is enjoyed by the JD(U), is 2.5% of the state's population while the Koeris were significantly 7%. The failure of Nitish Kumar to ally with other important castes, apart from the expulsion of Kushwaha, led to the massive BJP victory. The Rashtriya Lok Samata Party won the three seats it contested.

There was a split in the National Democratic Alliance in Bihar during this period. The JD(U) was running in the 2015 Bihar Legislative Assembly elections along with its all-time rival, the RJD of Lalu Prasad. The cause of this fissure was the poor performance of the JD(U) in the 2014 Lok Sabha elections and the ambitions of Nitish Kumar, who wanted to be the NDA's candidate for prime minister. He was dropped in favour of the more popular Narendra Modi. Nitish parted ways to join with his all-time rival RJD, which had been out of power in Bihar, for more than a decade. The alliance, called Mahagathbandhan, was formed with the Indian National Congress also a member. BJP had to satisfy itself with the RLSP and the Lok Janshakti Party as allies. The social engineering, as it was called, to rope in various castes and communities, led to the victory of Mahagathbandhan. The BJP and its alliance fared badly in the polls. The "caste divide" was considered the reason behind the results, and as the BJP is considered the party of the Upper Caste, it was natural for it to lose ground in a state dominated by Backwards. The Rashtriya Lok Samata Party of Upendra Kushwaha, which claimed to represent the Koeri caste, was unable to break the Luv-Kush equation—the hold of Nitish Kumar on the two caste group votes—and won only two seats.

Mahagathbandhan's victory led to the formation of an RJD-JD(U) government in the state for the first time in 2015. One noticeable impact of the RJD-JD(U) alliance was the massive increase in the number of Koeri, Kurmi and Yadav legislators in the state at the cost of the upper castes, who were reduced to their lowest share in the assembly for the first time. The Upendra Kushwaha lobby could not secure the Koeri votes in favour of the BJP. The BJP later recognised that Nitish was still a commanding authority over the support of both communities. Even after taking populist steps like the celebration of Samrat Ashoka Jayanti under the leadership of the Koeri leaders of the BJP, and promptly supporting the pseudo-historical claims of the Koeri caste of having Mauryan lineage, the community voted for Mahagathbandhan. Recognising the importance of Kumar, the BJP brought him into the NDA's fold, after his conflict with the RJD during the few months of combined government. The government fell after the JD(U) left Mahagathbandhan, and the NDA government of the JD(U)-BJP was formed again in the state in 2017. Upendra Kushwaha, who had ambitions for the post of chief minister, found it would be difficult to obtain after the return of Nitish Kumar into the NDA. The 2019 General Election to the Lok Sabha saw hue and cry in the national media over Kushwaha's anti coalition steps. He met Lalu Yadav, who was undergoing treatment in the hospital, and the media revealed several skirmishes in the NDA over the issue of seat sharing. The BJP was accused by its small allies like the Rashtriya Lok Samata Party and the Lok Janshakti Party of not giving them due importance in the distribution of seats.

Amidst these insecurities, Kushwaha left the NDA. The decision to leave came after his controversial "Kheer remark", (Note: Yaduvanshiyon ka dudh aur Kushwansiyon ka chawal mil jaye to kheer ban sakti hai (kheer can be prepared with the milk from the Yadavs and rice from the Kushwahas)”. ...” We will get the sugar from Brahmins, Tulsi from Choudharyji (RLSP Bihar chief Bhudev Choudhary), and can make delicious kheer with the dry-fruits from the backward classes and Dalits. Then we can relish the delicious kheer together.) through which he sought to achieve the alliance of the Koeri and the Yadav castes against the natural alliance of the Kurmi and the Koeris. Since its formation in 2013, the Rashtriya Lok Samata Party had attracted several big Koeri leaders to it, including Shri Bhagwan Singh Kushwaha and Nagmani to become a party dominated by the Koeris. However, the BJP-JDU, with their social engineering, were able to disrupt the social coalition of the new Mahagathbandhan (Grand Alliance), which included the Rashtriya Janata Dal and the Rashtriya Lok Samata Party, among others.

== Alliance after 2019 ==
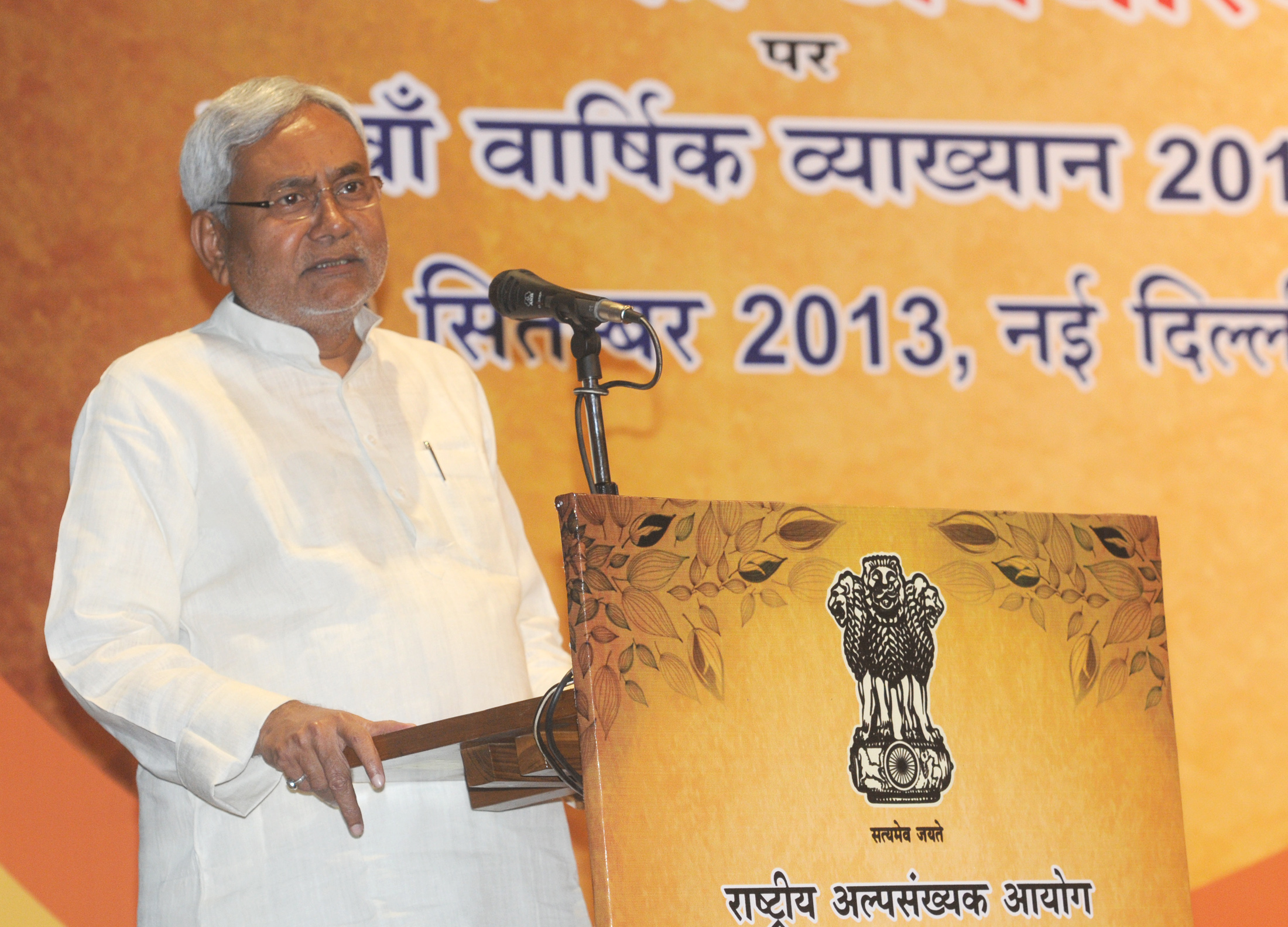
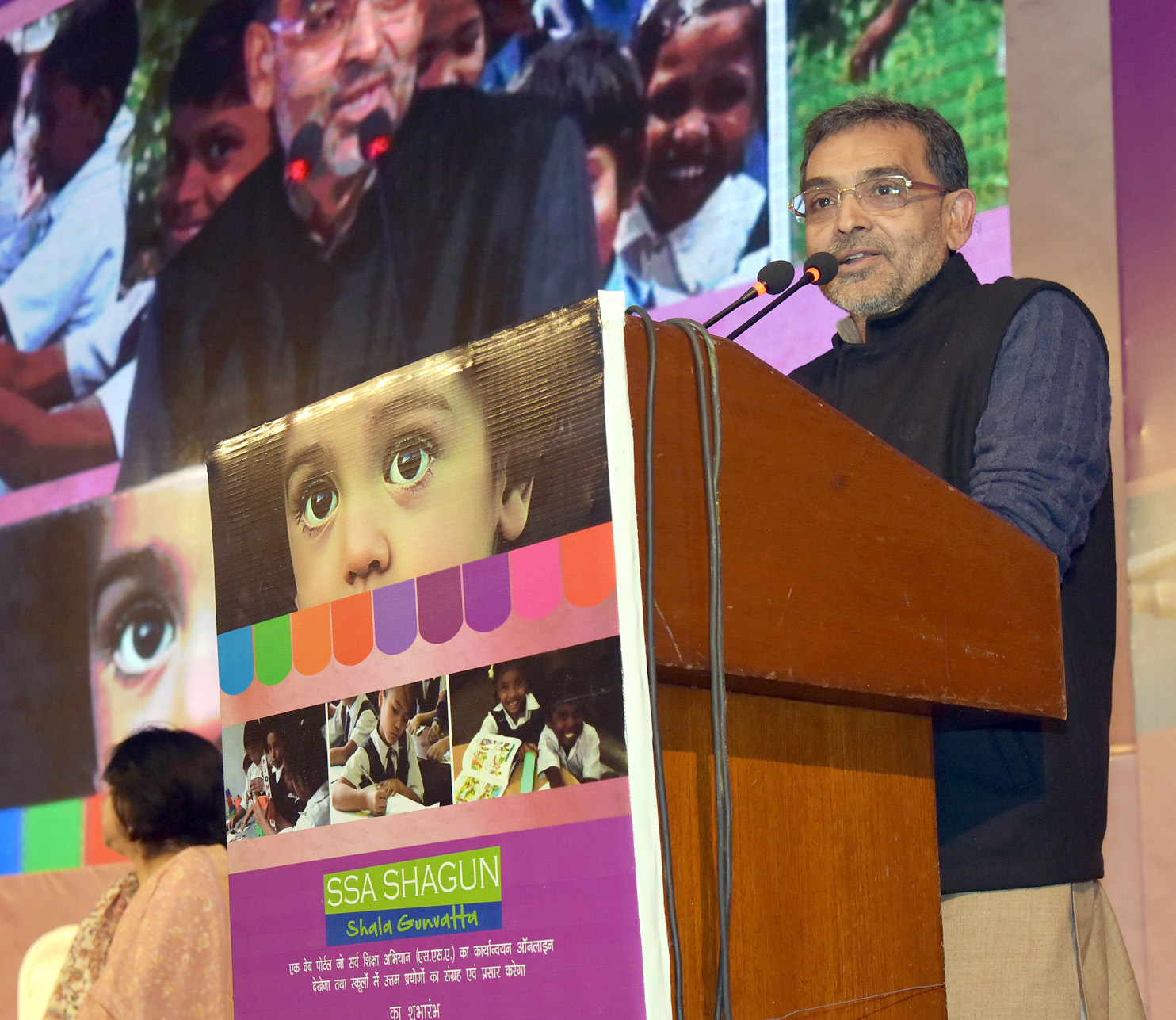
Nitish Kumar and Upendra Kushwaha, after Kushwaha debuted from Jandaha in politics of Bihar, he was patronised by Kumar. Kushwaha was promoted frequently to the post of leader of opposition in the Bihar Legislative Assembly, but founded Rashtriya Lok Samata Party in 2013 amidst differences with Kumar. In 2020, he returned to Janata Dal (United) with the merger of his party into it.

After the poor performance of the Mahagathbandhan in the 2019 general election to the Lok Sabha, Kushwaha got an opportunity to drop the Grand Alliance. The pretext sought was the leadership of Tejashwi Yadav as the chief minister of Bihar from the alliance camp. Kushwaha repudiated this as he sought another nominee for the same post. After internal discussions, he decided not to join either the Mahagathbandhan or the National Democratic Alliance, but chose to run for the 2020 Bihar Legislative Assembly elections alone in an alliance with a few minor players like All India Majlis-e-Ittehadul Muslimeen, considered to have the support of radical Muslims and the Bahujan Samaj Party, a significant player in Uttar Pradesh. The new alliance was called the Grand Democratic Secular Front and was eyeing the votes of the Kushwahas, Muslims and Dalits. The alliance chose Upendra Kushwaha as their chief ministerial candidate and was to put up firm resistance to both the NDA and Mahagathbandhan blocs.

The poll strategy of RLSP, which was leading this bloc, was to collect the votes of the Koeri or the Kushwaha community. Intending to rope in the second largest community of Bihar, 40% of the seats of the RLSP share went to the candidate from this caste group. Janata Dal (United), which relies upon same social coalition, took steps to consolidate its "Luv-Kush equation", by giving a significant number of tickets to the Koeri and Kurmi castes. The poll result went against the expectations of RLSP and Upendra Kushwaha. It performed badly, winning no seats, but its hold over the Koeri caste hurt the JD(U) in over a dozen constituencies. It ended up scoring up to 30,000 votes in some of the Kushwaha-dominated seats of Bihar and significantly reduced the JDU's clout in the assembly elections. The JDU now became the junior partner in the NDA against the BJP. Its seats in the assembly were reduced from 75 in the 2015 Bihar Assembly Elections to 43 in the 2020 elections. Questions were raised in the NDA bloc over the leadership and efficacy of Nitish Kumar, but despite this, the NDA chose him to be the chief minister of Bihar again. The impact of the JD(U)-RLSP was also seen in the massive reduction in the number of Kushwaha and Kurmi legislators in the newly elected assembly.

Kumar and Kushwaha later realised that the alliance of both parties could be beneficial, and proposals were sent to RLSP leaders to merge with the JDU. The RLSP was initially inclined to become a part of the NDA but was not in favour of the merger. But after the meetings with the JD(U) leadership, it was formally merged into the JD(U). Upendra Kushwaha was given the post of president of the Parliamentary Board of the JDU and was nominated for Member of Legislative Council's post by the party. Before the merger, a faction of the RLSP, under one of its leaders Virendra Kushwaha, was merged with the Rashtriya Janata Dal. After merging with the RLSP, Nitish set out to consolidate its old social coalition of the Koeri and Kurmi castes. Ramchandra Prasad Singh, who belonged to the Awadhiya Kurmi community, was made national president of the party, while Umesh Singh Kushwaha, a young leader from Mahnar, was made the party's Bihar state president.

The 2020 legislative assembly elections in Bihar proved to be disastrous for the JD(U), as the number of seats of the ruling party was reduced to 43 from 115 in 2010. The humangous loss was not only due to defection of leaders like Upendra Kushwaha, but also due to weaning away of a significant vote base with the party. In order to strengthen its old vote base, some arrangements were done in the party, giving more representation to the members of Koeri and Kurmi caste. Besides, the party also brought a powerful "Extremely Backward Caste" called Dhanuk in the socio-political coalition of the Luv-Kush equation. The Dhanuks, who claimed origin from "Jaswar clan" of the Kurmi caste are estimated to be 5% of the population of Bihar. It was expected that if the political unity of Koeri, Kurmi and Dhanuk is cemented, it will form a powerful force in the politics of Bihar.

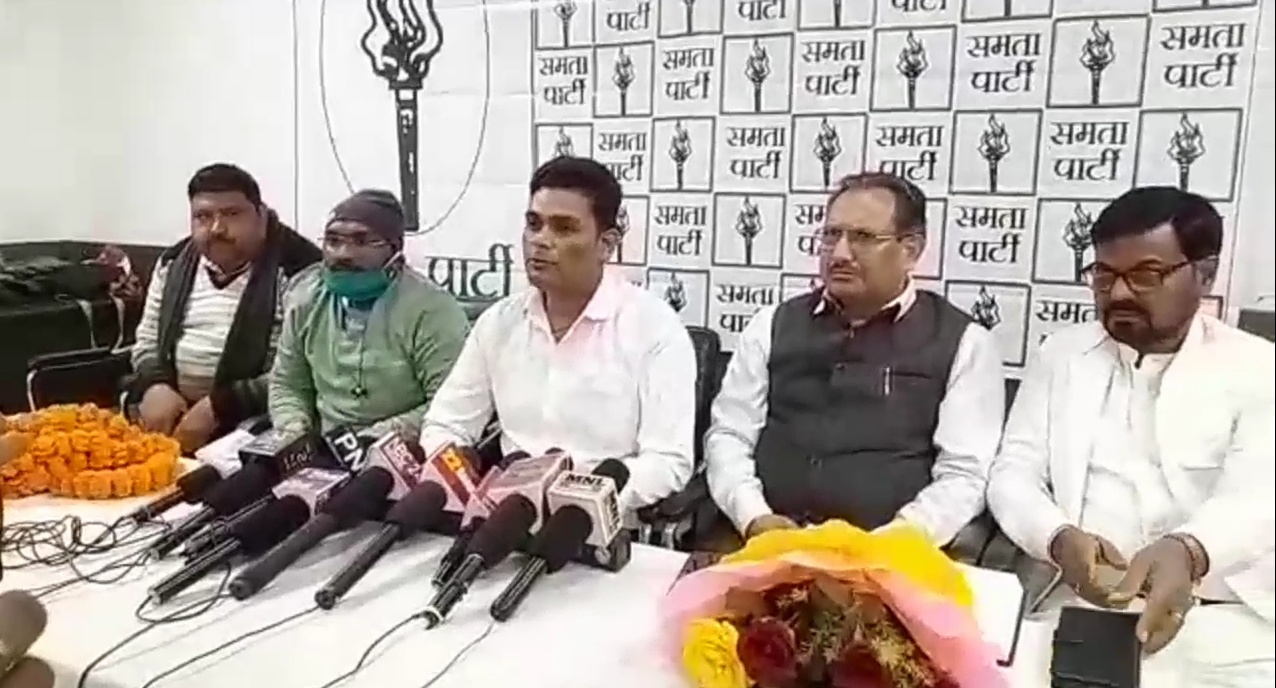
Samata Party President Uday Mandal Press Conference at Patna in 20 December 2022.

In 2022, Uday Mandal, President of Samata Party announced that Dhanuk Caste will lead Luv-Kush against Nitish Kumar because Mr. Kumar announced to give the leadership of the Mahagathbandan to Tejaswi Yadav.

== 2022–23 ==
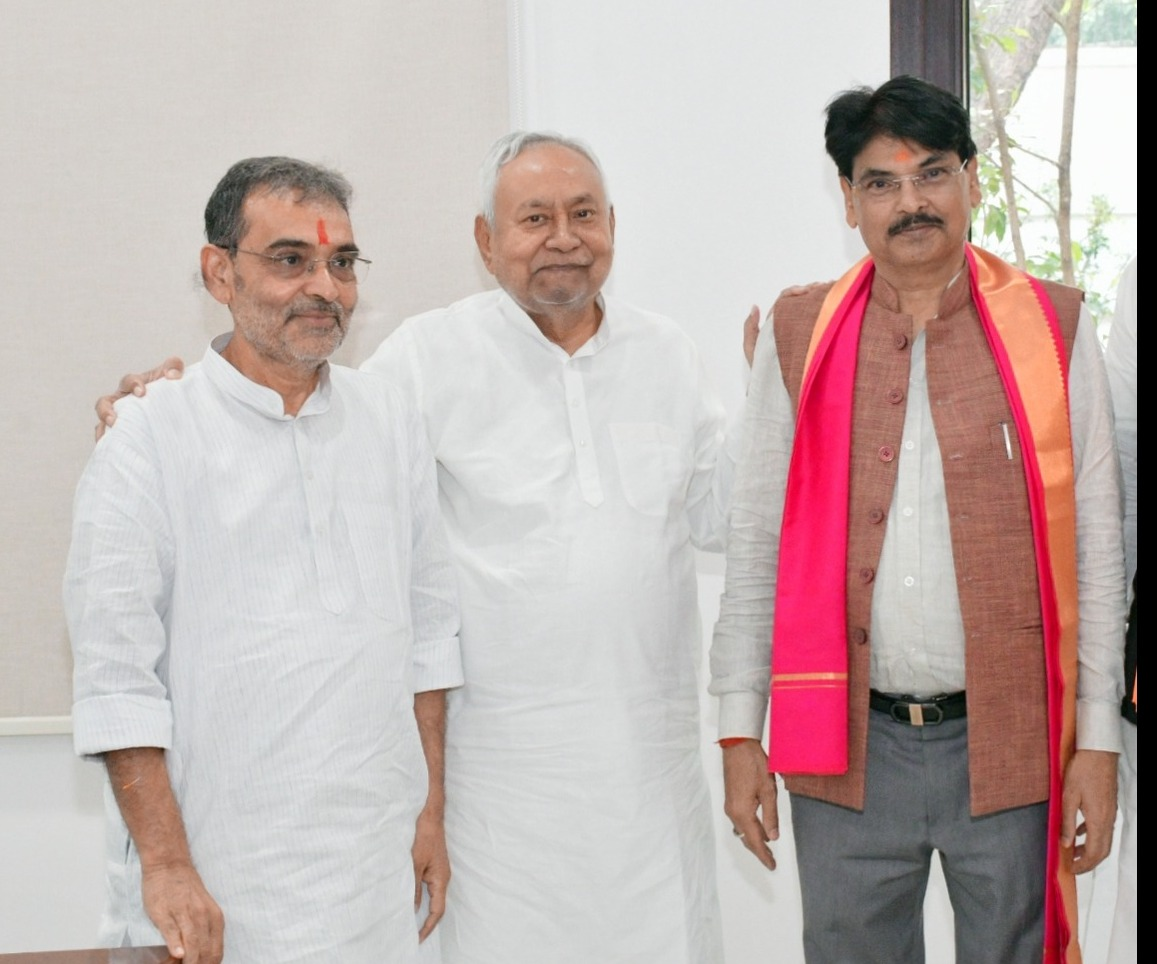
Upendra Kushwaha with Nitish Kumar on 27 August 2024, after getting elected to the Rajya Sabha as the president of Rashtriya Lok Morcha and a candidate of National Democratic Alliance.

In February 2023, a political crisis emerged in the ruling Janata Dal (United), between the Parliamentary Board president Upendra Kushwaha and the other leaders. Kushwaha was reported to have merged his Rashtriya Lok Samata Party into JDU with an eye on the position of Nitish Kumar's successor in state politics and JDU. However, Kumar announced that in 2025 Bihar Assembly elections, Tejashwi Yadav will be face of Mahagathbandhan. This resulted in Kushwaha becoming a critic of Yadav, as his successor hopes were dashed. kushwaha announced a meeting in Patna, in which he invoked all the members of his organisation, "Mahatma Phule Samata Parishad" and those members of Rashtriya Lok Samata Party, who were in JDU to join. The JDU saw it as anti-party activity, but didn't take any step to oust Kushwaha from party. Kushwaha further stressed that giving the leadership in the hands of Tejaswi Yadav will ruin the state. Later, in February 2023, Kushwaha left the JDU and announced the formation of a new political party called Rashtriya Lok Janata Dal.

The year of 2023 also saw a political realignment in the state of Bihar as Bharatiya Janata Party, which was seeking way to strengthen itself in the state's electoral politics, appointed Samrat Chaudhary as its state president. According to political analysts, the step was taken in a bid to wean away the Koeri or Kushwaha voters from JDU and Nitish Kumar. The BJP which was supported primarily by the Forward Castes and Bania community in Bihar wanted an expansion in its political base and since Yadavs were strongly aligned to Rashtriya Janata Dal and Lalu Prasad Yadav, it was economical to woo Koeris, who were second largest community in state. As a response to this step of BJP, and due to concerns over shifting of Koeri voters to BJP, the JDU made a major rearrangement in party's organisation. It appointed 4 National Secretaries belonging to Koeri caste; which includes Shri Bhagwan Singh Kushwaha, Santosh Kumar Kushwaha, Ram Kumar Sharma and Ramsewak Singh Kushwaha. Many leaders of Kushwaha caste were also given significant positions in the state committee of JDU. Meanwhile, BJP started mobilising Koeris aggressively by organising birth anniversary of Emperor Ashoka; the party even supported the bid of Koeri caste that Ashoka belonged to this community.
