= Mehdar =

Village in Siwan, Bihar

Mehdar मेंहदार Menhdar or Mehndar
- Village
- Location within Bihar Location within India
- Coordinates: 25.987°N 84.438°E
- Country: India
- State: Bihar
- District: Siwan district
- Block: Siswan

Government
  - Type: Local Government
  - Body: Panchayati Raj
  - Panchayat: Ramgarh
  - Mukhiya: Chanda Bharati

Area
  - Total: 0.88 km^{2} (0.34 sq mi)
- Elevation: 57 m (187 ft)

Population (2,011 Census)
  - Total: 146
  - Density: 170/km^{2} (430/sq mi)

Languages
  - Official: Hindi & English
  - Regional: Bhojpuri

Demographics
  - Literacy: 80.14% Males: 56 (80.00%); Females:61 (80.26%)
  - Sex ratio: 92; Males: 70; Females: 76
- Time zone: UTC+5:30 (IST)
- PIN: 841203
- ISO 3166 code: IN-BR
- Vehicle registration: BR29
- Website: siwan.nic.in

Mehdar or Mehndar/Menhdar is an Indian village located in the Siswan block of Siwan district in Bihar, India. It's approximately 32 kilometers south of the district headquarters in Siwan. It is known for its religious significance, with a sacred Hindu place and a temple dedicated to Lord Shiva. Many devotees from the surrounding areas visit this temple.

== History ==
The village is well known for the Mahendranath Temple. This temple was built by King Mahendrabir Vikram Sahdev of Nepal. The village is located near to Daha River.

== Geography ==
According to the government records, the village code of Mehdar is 232790. The total geographical area of Menhdar village is 88 Hectares. The village has 23 houses.

== Demographics ==
The 2011 Census of India recorded Menhdar village in Bihar with a population of 146, including 70 males and 76 females, spread across 23 households. The village has a notable literacy rate of 80.14%, with 56 literate males and 61 literate females.

== See also ==
- Siswan
- List of villages in Siwan district
- Siwan subdivision
- Administration in Bihar
- Daraunda Assembly constituency
- Siwan Lok Sabha constituency
