= Mahendra Nath Temple, Siwan =

Hindu temple in Bihar, India

Mahendra Nath Temple
- महेंद्रा नाथ मंदिर
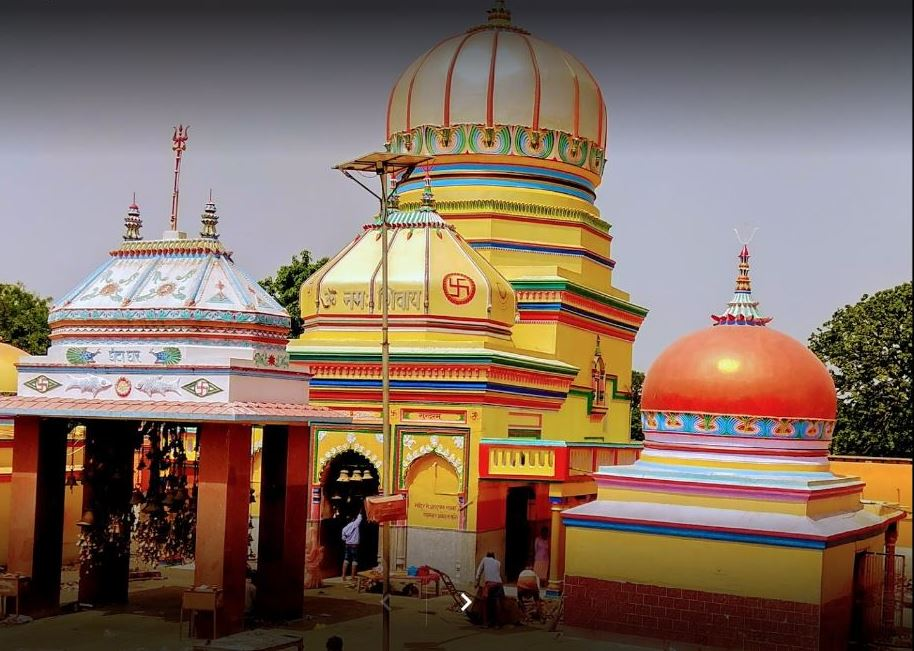
- Front, Mahendra Nath Temple

Religion
- Affiliation: Hinduism
- District: Siwan
- Deity: Lord Shiva
- Festival: Maha Shivaratri

Location
- Location: Mehdar, Ramgarh, 841203
- State: Bihar
- Country: India
- Interactive map of Mahendra Nath Temple
- Coordinates: 25°48′55″N 84°43′56″E

Architecture
- Type: Hindu temple
- Creator: King Mahendravir Vikram Sahdev
- Established: 1523; 503 years ago

Specifications
- Site area: 32.24 acres (0.1 km^{2})
- Temple: 2
- Inscriptions: none
- Elevation: 57 m (187 ft)

Website
- siwan.nic.in

Mahendra Nath Temple also known as Mehdar Dham, is 17th-century ancient mahendranath temple of Lord Shiva, located in the Mehandar village of Siswan block, about 35 km from Siwan district of Bihar state. The temple was built by Nepal King Mahendravir Vikram Sahdev in the seventeenth century and was named Mahendranath. It is believed that by offering water to the Shivalinga of Mehandar, childless people get children and skin patients get relief from skin diseases. The temple is on the bank of Kamaldah Lake, and is the largest Shiva temple complex in North Western Bihar.

== History ==
It is believed that hundreds of years ago, King Mahendravir Vikram Sahdev of Nepal was suffering from leprosy. He was going to Varanasi through this road through the jungle. During the night during the journey, he decided to rest in this forest. In his night sleep, King Mahendra saw Shiva. Shiva said there is a small pond here, take a bath in it and there is a Shivling buried near the poplar tree. The king got up in the morning and took a bath in the pond and took out Shiva and performed ablution. The king was cured of his leprosy. Pleased with this, King Mahendra built a temple there and expanded the pond to 52 bighas.

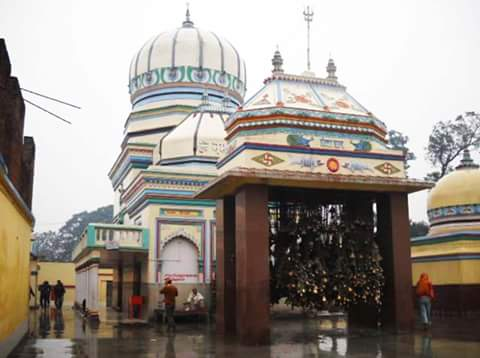
Mahendranath temple

People have immense faith in this place.

== Architecture of the temple ==
The Mahendranath Temple majestically exemplifies Bihar's traditional temple architecture, gracefully blending elements of the Nagara and Vesara styles.

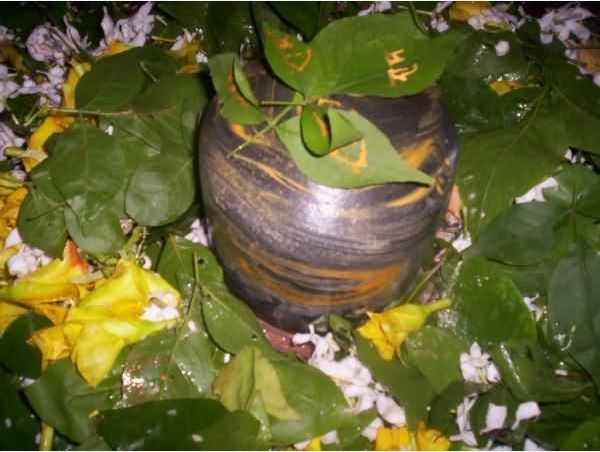
Shivling Baba Mahendra Nath Mandir, Mehdar, Siwan (Bihar)

=== Carvings ===
Both the temple's interior and exterior are lavishly embellished with detailed stone carvings depicting deities, celestial beings, and narratives from the Ramayana and Mahabharata.

=== Entrance ===
The elaborate gateway marks the transition from the ordinary to the divine, inviting worshippers into the sacred precinct.

== 2022 Sawan crowd incident ==
On 18 July 2022, the temple witnessed a crowd-related incident during the first Monday of the Hindu month of Sawan. A large number of devotees had gathered at the temple from the early hours to offer water to the Shiva lingam. According to contemporary reports, when the temple gates opened at around 3 am, devotees began entering in large numbers, resulting in heavy crowding, pushing and a brief stampede-like situation near the entrance.

Two women died after being caught in the crowd. They were identified as Lilawati Devi, a resident of Pratappur in Hussainganj police station area, and Sohag Mati, from Pathar village under Jiradei police station. Two other women, Shiv Kumari and Ajhoria Devi, were injured in the incident and were taken to Siwan Sadar Hospital for treatment.

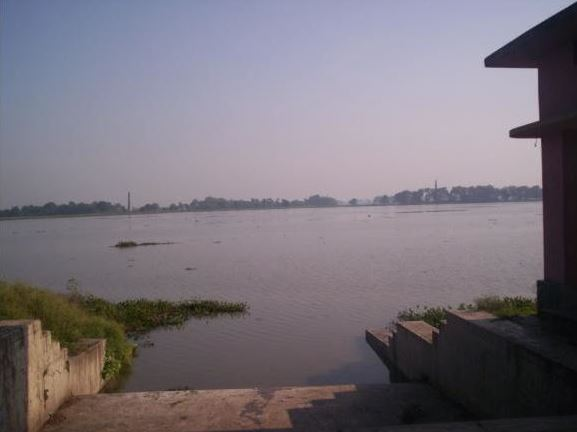
Sarovar, Mahendra Nath Temple

Following the incident, police and local administration personnel were deployed at the temple to manage the crowd and maintain security. Reports also stated that the situation at the temple was brought under control later that morning.

== Location ==
=== By air ===
- 140 kilometres from Kushinagar International Airport
- Approximately 115 kilometres from Patna Airport

== See also ==
- Mehdar
- Ramgarh Panchayat
- Siwan district
- Thawe Mandir
- Mitheshwarnath Shiva Temple
- Gupta Dham
- Burhanath temple
