= Patna Pride March =

LGBTQ event in Patna, India

The Patna Pride March, held in Patna, India, is a civil rights march for lesbian, gay, bisexual, transgender, and queer (LGBTQ) people to build communities and socialize. There have been three iterations of the march over a period of seven years.

== 2012 Pride March ==
The city of Patna saw a Pride March on 29 March 2012. This was a small procession, starting at the historical Gandhi Maidan and concluding at the busy Dak Bunglow Chowk.

This march was organised by Project Pehchaan and a local Patna group run by Reshma Prasad called Dostana Safar. It was a small event with just 20 attending participants.

Patna University also had previously organised a session on Queer Literature at a refresher course for English Lecturers.

== 2017 Pride March ==
In 2017, the Pride March was repeated when members walked on Veer Chand Patel Marg, from R-Block to Miller High School. The group then stood outside Miller High School, holding placards and banners.

The 2017 march was held to demand respect and create sensibility towards the community and also demand for equal rights. The regional manager of the Voluntary Health Services (VHS) Girish Kumar said that the charter of the demands will be sent to the chief minister, Mr. Nitish Kumar.

== 2019 Pride March ==
To mark International Non-Binary People's Day, the 2019 Patna Pride March took place on 14 July 2019. The centerpiece of the march was the world’s largest transgender flag, although only a few feet wide, it was long, with over 500 people carrying it in the parade route. They went from the historic Hindi Sahitya Samelan to Rajendra Nagar’s Prem Chandra Rangshala, the path of which covers 1.8 kilometers of the city.
