= 2023 Odisha Socially and Educationally Backward Classes Survey =

Odisha Socially and Educationally Backward Classes Survey 2023
- Date: 1 May – 6 June 2023
- Location: Odisha, India
- Type: Socio-economic survey
- Cause: Assessment of SEBC population and conditions
- Organized by: Odisha State Commission for Backward Classes (OSCBC)
- Outcome: Report submitted October 3, 2023; not yet public

The Odisha Socially and Educationally Backward Classes Survey 2023 was a state-wide socio-economic and educational survey conducted by the Odisha State Commission for Backward Classes (OSCBC) to assess the demographic, social, and economic conditions of Socially and Educationally Backward Classes (SEBCs) in Odisha, India. Conducted between 1 May and 6 June 2023, across 314 blocks and 114 urban local bodies, the survey aimed to provide data to inform welfare policies and reservation frameworks for SEBCs, encompassing 208 backward castes. The findings, submitted to the Odisha state government on 3 October 2023, estimated that SEBCs constitute approximately 39.31% of the state's population, though some sources reported a higher figure of 46%. As of May 2025, the report remains unpublished.

== Background ==
The survey was initiated in response to the absence of comprehensive caste-based data in India, with the last national caste census conducted in 1931. The 2021 decadal census was postponed due to the COVID-19 pandemic, prompting states like Odisha and Bihar to undertake independent surveys to address data gaps for policy formulation. In Odisha, the survey was driven by the need to update the socio-economic profile of SEBCs, who have historically been underrepresented in education and employment despite comprising an estimated 54% of the population based on 1931 data. The initiative aligned with constitutional mandates for inclusive growth and followed advocacy for caste-based reservations in education and government jobs, where SEBCs currently have only an 11.25% job reservation quota and no educational reservation.

== Methodology ==
The OSCBC survey was conducted both online and offline, with voluntary participation facilitated through common service centers, Public Distribution System (PDS) outlets, and Anganwadi centers. Respondents provided details using ration and Aadhaar cards, answering questions on household composition, education, occupation, housing, and access to infrastructure like schools, hospitals, and markets. The survey covered approximately 53.96 million households across Odisha's 30 districts, targeting a projected 2023 population of 49.56 million (extrapolated from the 2011 census figure of 41.95 million). Critics, including opposition parties, noted lower participation in urban areas like Bhubaneswar and Cuttack, attributing it to the lack of door-to-door enumeration.

== Findings ==
=== Population estimates ===
The survey estimated that SEBCs constitute 39.31% of Odisha's population, totaling approximately 19.49 million individuals based on a projected 2023 population of 49.56 million. This figure contrasts with a Hindustan Times report claiming SEBCs make up 46% (10.95 million), a discrepancy possibly due to differing population bases or reporting errors, as 46% of 48 million yields 22.08 million. The 39.31% figure is lower than the historical 54% estimate from 1931, prompting debates about methodology and accuracy.

=== Educational profile ===
The survey highlighted significant educational disparities among SEBCs:

- 37.6% have primary-level education.
- 10.1% are illiterate.
- 49.6% have low-level education (primary or below matriculation).
- 22% hold matriculation, intermediate, ITI, or diploma qualifications.
- 7.9% are graduates or post-graduates.
- 1.6% have professional degrees, and 0.5% have education beyond post-graduation.

=== Occupational distribution ===
SEBCs' occupational data revealed reliance on low-skill and informal sectors:

- 19.3% engage in agriculture with own land.
- 5.3% are agricultural laborers.
- 8% work in non-agricultural activities.
- 4.8% are self-employed.
- 2% are agriculture sharecroppers.
- 3.2% follow traditional occupations.
- 25.2% are in other occupations, often informal.

In employment, only 2.8% of SEBCs hold government jobs, 4.7% are in non-government salaried roles, and 1.3% are professionals, underscoring limited access to high-skill sectors.

=== Geographical distribution ===
The survey identified regional variations in SEBC population concentration:

- Very High (>45%): 11 districts, including Balangir, Bhadrak, Boudh, Ganjam, and Puri.
- High (30–45%): 8 districts, such as Cuttack, Jajpur, and Khurda.
- Moderate (15–30%): 11 districts, mostly tribal, including Koraput and Mayurbhanj.

Six districts—Boudh, Ganjam, Kendrapara, Nayagarh (58%), Puri, and Jagatsinghpur—reported SEBC populations exceeding 50%.

== Political and social implications ==
The survey's findings have sparked significant political contention. The ruling Biju Janata Dal (BJD), led by Chief Minister Naveen Patnaik, has not released the report, possibly to leverage its data for electoral strategies in the 2024 general elections. Opposition parties, including the Bharatiya Janata Party (BJP) and Indian National Congress, have demanded its immediate publication, criticizing the survey as inadequate and calling for a comprehensive caste census. Congress leader Sarat Pattanayak labeled the survey an "eyewash," citing low urban participation and methodological flaws.

The survey aligns with a national trend of state-led caste surveys, as seen in Bihar, Madhya Pradesh, and Maharashtra, reflecting growing demands for caste-based data to address socio-economic disparities. In Odisha, the findings could influence policies on SEBC reservations and welfare, particularly given the community’s underrepresentation relative to its population share.

== Criticism ==
The survey faced criticism for its voluntary participation model and lack of door-to-door enumeration, which opposition leaders argued led to underreporting, particularly in urban areas. The discrepancy between the reported 39.31% and 46% SEBC population figures has fueled debates over data reliability. Additionally, the non-publication of the report has raised transparency concerns, with analysts suggesting the BJD’s delay may be politically motivated.

== Future outlook ==
The survey's data could shape Odisha's reservation policies, welfare schemes, and political strategies, particularly if released. It underscores the need for targeted interventions to address SEBCs' educational and economic backwardness, as evidenced by their low representation in higher education and government jobs. The OSCBC has recommended using the findings for inclusive growth, but the report's impact depends on its public disclosure and subsequent policy actions.

== See also ==
- Caste system in India
- Other Backward Class
- 2022 Bihar caste-based survey
- Reservation in India
