= 2015 Karnataka Socio-Economic and Education Survey =

Population survey in India

Karnataka Socio-Economic and Education Survey 2015
- Date: 2015
- Location: Karnataka, India
- Participants: Over 160,000 personnel
- Outcome: Surveyed over 10.6 million households, informing policy debates

The Karnataka Socio-Economic and Education Survey 2015 was a comprehensive demographic and socio-economic study conducted by the Government of Karnataka to collect data on caste, education, employment, and income. Initiated under Chief Minister Siddaramaiah and led by H Kantharaj of the Karnataka State Commission for Backward Classes, it covered over 10.6 million households at a cost of ₹162 crore. Aimed at shaping policies for marginalized groups like Scheduled Castes, Scheduled Tribes, and Other Backward Classes, the survey's leaked findings, reported in 2018, sparked debate over caste representation. Tabled in the Karnataka Cabinet on April 11, 2025, the survey remains a focal point for social justice and reservation policy discussions.

== Background ==
The survey was launched in 2015 to address the absence of updated caste data since the 2011 Census of India, driven by the Indian National Congress-led government's commitment to social equity. It sought to gather detailed insights into caste, income, education, and employment to inform welfare and reservation policies for Karnataka’s estimated 61 million residents. The initiative, costing ₹162 crore, responded to demands for inclusive policy-making amid national discussions on caste-based data.

== Methodology ==
Conducted in 2015, the survey mobilized over 160,000 personnel, including enumerators and supervisors, to visit more than 10.6 million households across Karnataka. Overseen by the Karnataka State Commission for Backward Classes, it used door-to-door data collection to capture caste, income, education, and employment details.

=== Implementation ===
- Scope: The survey reached over 10.6 million households, covering urban and rural areas.
- Personnel: Over 160,000 staff ensured comprehensive data collection.
- Cost: The project cost ₹162 crore, funded by the state government.
- Oversight: The Backward Classes Commission managed logistics, aiming for accuracy.

=== Challenges ===
The scale of the survey likely posed logistical issues, such as accessing remote areas and ensuring respondent cooperation, though specific obstacles are not detailed in available reports. The report, completed in 2015, remained unpublished until April 2025 due to political sensitivities.

== Findings ==
While the official report awaits public release as of May 3, 2025, leaked data from 2018, reported by media, outlined Karnataka’s demographic composition:

Demographic Breakdown by Caste
Category	Percentage
Scheduled Castes (SC)	19.5%
Muslims	16%
Vokkaligas	14%
Lingayats	11%
Kurubas (OBC)	7%
Other Backward Classes (OBC)	20%
Marginalized Communities (SCs, STs, Muslims, Kurubas)	47.5%

The data, collected voluntarily, suggests marginalized groups comprise nearly half the population, fueling debates on reservation adjustments.

== Implications ==
The survey’s findings are expected to influence reservation policies in education, employment, and politics, potentially expanding quotas to reflect demographic realities. Chief Minister Siddaramaiah has indicated decisions will follow a report from the Backward Classes Commission, due by November 2023, with a possible sub-committee to review data. The survey aligns with national calls for caste censuses, as seen in Bihar, and could set a precedent for policy-making.

Financially, changes in reservation policies might affect sectors like education and employment, influencing companies in these areas. However, as of May 3, 2025, no direct market impacts are reported, and financial implications remain speculative pending policy actions.

== Controversies and reception ==
The survey has faced significant controversy, particularly from Vokkaligas and Lingayats, who claim underrepresentation. The All India Veerashaiva-Lingayat Mahasabha questioned the data’s accuracy, escalating political tensions. Internal Congress opposition, including from leaders like DK Shivakumar, delayed the report’s tabling until April 2025. The Bharatiya Janata Party, via former CM Basavaraj Bommai, has reserved comment pending the official report.

Analysts like A Narayana from Azim Premji University suggest the data could reshape political narratives, while Dr. Sandeep Shastri notes Congress’s cautious approach to avoid alienating dominant castes. Despite controversies, the survey is seen as a vital step toward addressing inequalities.

== See also ==
- Caste system in India
- 2022 Bihar caste-based survey
- Reservation in India
- 2011 Census of India
