= Reshma Prasad =

Indian transgender activist

- Occupation: Transgender activist
- Known for: Founder of Dostana Safar, first transgender university senator in India

Reshma Prasad is a transgender activist based in Bihar, India. She founded Dostana Safar, a community organisation that supports transgender people in Bihar.

== Activism ==
In 2018 Prasad submitted a petition to the Supreme Court, requesting a third gender be included on PAN cards, allowing transgender people to be accurately represented on their ID. In 2024 The Centre supported the move and advised the Supreme Court to support the petition.

Prasad has previously organised the Patna Pride March. She is a member of the National Council for Transgender Community, which was founded in 2020.

Prasad founded Dostana Safar, community organisation that supports the Hijra community in Bihar. In June 2023 the organisation opened a restaurant in Patna, staffed entirely with members of the transgender community.

Prasad was vocal about issues with the 2022 Bihar Caste-Based Survey, run by the Bihar government, calling the data "fake". Initially concerns were raised after transgender people were considered a separate caste, which cased the Patna High Court to order the survey paused, until final orders were decided upon. Prasad argued that that transgender people should not be put in a caste, as it compromises their individual identity. As their transgender identity was related to their gender, Prasad wondering if male or female could also be considered castes. The Patna High Court later ruled that transgender people should be identified as a separate group, rather than as a caste.

When the results of the survey were released, concerns were raised about the numbers. A previous census in 2011 found over 42,000 members of the transgender community living in Bihar, but the 2023 census only counted 825. Prasad claimed she had never been counted in the survey.

In December 2023, Prasad became a member of the senate for Patna University following a nomination from Rajendra Arlekar. She became the first transgender person in India to hold a role in university senate. As a senator Prasad said she aimed to ensure the transgender community would not face harassment or issues with their admissions.
