= 2024 Andhra Pradesh Comprehensive Caste Survey =

Population survey in India

- Date: Planned for December 2023
- Location: Andhra Pradesh, India
- Type: Statewide demographic survey
- Cause: Policy formulation for marginalized communities
- Organised by: Government of Andhra Pradesh
- Outcome: Results not publicly released (as of May 2025)

The 2024 Andhra Pradesh Comprehensive Caste Survey was a proposed statewide demographic survey initiated by the Government of Andhra Pradesh to collect detailed data on caste, socio-economic status, education, and livelihoods. Approved in November 2023, the survey aimed to inform equitable policy-making and welfare schemes for marginalized communities. As of May 2025, no official results have been released, raising questions about the survey's completion or public disclosure.

== Background ==
Caste-based surveys have gained prominence in India as tools for addressing social inequalities through data-driven governance. Following the example of 2022 Bihar caste-based survey, which revealed 63% of its population as Other Backward Classes (OBCs), Andhra Pradesh sought to conduct a similar exercise. The initiative was driven by the need to quantify caste demographics and socio-economic conditions to enhance welfare programs, as emphasized by Chief Minister Y.S. Jagan Mohan Reddy.

On 3 November 2023, the Andhra Pradesh cabinet formally approved the survey, designating the Backward Classes (BC) Welfare Department as the nodal agency. The survey was intended to provide a comprehensive dataset to support policies aimed at reducing poverty and discrimination.

== Objectives ==
The survey aimed to:

- Map caste demographics across Andhra Pradesh's 26 districts.
- Collect data on education, employment, housing, and access to amenities such as clean water and sanitation.
- Support the formulation of targeted welfare schemes for Scheduled Castes (SC), Scheduled Tribes (ST), Backward Classes (BC), and other marginalized groups.
- Enhance transparency in resource allocation through evidence-based governance.

== Methodology ==
The survey was designed to leverage Andhra Pradesh's village and ward secretariat system, with volunteers tasked with data collection. Authentication processes, including biometric, OTP, face, or iris-based eKYC, were implemented to ensure data accuracy. The process involved:

- Pre-survey consultations with caste leaders and community representatives across districts.
- Data collection on socio-economic indicators, including household amenities and educational attainment.
- Collaboration among multiple departments, including SC Welfare, Tribal Welfare, and Minority Welfare.

A pilot phase was launched on 15 November 2023, with the full survey scheduled to begin on 9 December 2023. Results were initially expected by January 2024.

== Implementation challenges ==
Several challenges emerged during the planning phase:

- Timeline Concerns: Community representatives, including those from the Kalinga Vysya community, argued that the one-week data collection period was insufficient for accurate results.
- Logistical Overlap: Concurrent welfare programs reportedly delayed the survey's start to 10 December 2023.
- Community Engagement: Calls for broader consultations to ensure inclusivity were raised during pre-survey meetings.

As of May 2025, no official results or updates have been published, suggesting potential delays, incomplete execution, or restricted disclosure. The absence of data on the Andhra Pradesh state portal further complicates verification.

== Political context ==
The survey was a politically significant initiative, with caste-based data seen as critical for electoral strategies and social justice advocacy. In November 2024, Andhra Pradesh Congress Committee president Y. S. Sharmila renewed calls for a caste survey, citing unfulfilled promises by the Bharatiya Janata Party (BJP) from 2017. The lack of results has fueled debates about transparency and governance in the state.

== Comparison with other states ==
Unlike Bihar, which successfully published its 2023 caste survey results, Andhra Pradesh's efforts remain inconclusive. The Bihar model, which informed Andhra Pradesh's approach, demonstrated the potential for caste data to reshape reservation policies and welfare distribution. The absence of similar outcomes in Andhra Pradesh highlights logistical or political barriers unique to the state.

== Impact and future prospects ==
The survey was intended to empower marginalized communities by providing a robust dataset for policy interventions. However, the lack of publicized results limits its immediate impact. Future efforts may require:

- Enhanced transparency in data release.
- Extended timelines for comprehensive data collection.
- Stronger community involvement to ensure inclusivity.

The initiative remains a focal point for discussions on social equity and governance in Andhra Pradesh, with potential to influence national debates on caste-based surveys.
