= Demographics of Bihar =

Demographic data on the Indian state

According to the 2023 Bihar Caste Census, Bihar had a total population of 130,725,310, nearly 83% of it rural. It was also India's most densely populated state, with 1,388 persons per square kilometre. 82% of Bihar's population practiced Hinduism, while 17.7% followed Islam.

As of 2011, the sex ratio was 1112 females per 1000 males. Almost 50% of Bihar's population was below 25 years age as of new report of 2026, which is yet again highest in India. At 17%, Bihar has one of the lowest urbanisation rate in India.

Most of Bihar's population belongs to a collection of ethnic groups speaking indic languages, the most prominent ones being Bhojpuri, Maithili and Magahi. It also attracted Punjabi Hindu refugees during the Partition of British India in 1947. Bihar has a total literacy rate of 70.70% (79.70% for males and 60.5 % for females), recording a growth of 20% in female literacy over the preceding decade. According to the 2011 census, 82.7% of Bihar's population practised Hinduism, while 16.9% followed Islam. As of 2026, Bihar has highest fertility rate of 2.7 in comparison to the other states of India but it had declined very rapidly in last 15 years. According to new NFHS - 6 report Population of people under 15 is 35.6 % of total population.

== Population ==
Population by age group (2001)
Age Group	Total	Male	Female
0–4	11,006,072	5,623,280	5,382,792
5–9	12,804,302	6,705,263	6,099,039
10–14	11,063,777	5,970,201	5,093,576
15–19	7,190,188	4,028,643	3,161,545
20–24	6,323,193	3,180,063	3,143,130
25–29	5,908,308	2,894,706	3,013,602
30–34	5,549,787	2,713,871	2,835,916
35–39	5,077,935	2,576,089	2,501,846
40–44	4,153,203	2,213,770	1,939,433
45–49	3,461,664	1,778,368	1,683,296
50–54	2,711,041	1,543,620	1,167,421
55–59	2,069,940	990,011	1,079,929
60–64	2,103,909	1,120,743	983,166
65–69	1,354,937	683,656	671,281
70–74	1,029,921	571,438	458,483
75–79	446,860	233,961	212,899
80+	565,647	312,207	253,440
Age not stated	177,825	103,905	73,920
All ages	82,998,509	43,243,795	39,754,714

== Religion ==
Religions in Bihar 2022
1. Hinduism (82.0%)
2. Islam (17.7%)
3. Others (0.30%)

Religion in Bihar
Religion	2001		2011		2022 survey	
Religion	Populat.	(%)	Populat.	(%)	Populat.	(%)
Hinduism	69,076,919	83.22	86,078,686	82.69	107,100,000	81.99
Islam	13,722,048	16.53	17,557,809	16.87	23,100,000	17.70
Christianity	53,137	0.06	129,247	0.12	75,238	0.05
Buddhism	18,818	0.06	25,453	0.02	111,000	0.08
Sikhism	20,780	0.03	23,779	0.02	14,753	0.01
Jainism	16,085	0.02	18,914	0.02	12,523	0.009
Other	52,905	0.06	13,437	0.01	16,600	0.13
Not stated	n/a (Note: The 2001 Census did not record a figure for people who did not specify their religion)	n/a	252,127	0.24	2,146	
Total	82,998,509	100%	104,099,452	100%	130,725,310	100%

As per the 2022 Bihar Caste-Based Survey, Hinduism is practised by 81.99% and Islam is followed by 17.70%.

== Caste and ethnic groups ==
As per Bihar government’s 2022 Bihar Caste-Based Survey report, released on 2 October 2023, showed that extremely backward classes (EBCs) account for 36.01 percent of the 130.7 million population of the state. BCs, EBCs together account for 63% of total population of Bihar.

Caste Groups of Bihar
Caste Groups	Population (%)
BC	27.12%
EBC	36.01%
Dalits (SCs)	19.65%
Forward caste	15.52%
Adivasis (STs)	1.68%

Caste	Population	Percentage
Yadav	18,650,119	14.2666%
Kushwaha (Koeri)	5,506,113	4.2120%
Kurmi	3,762,969	2.8785%
Brahmin	4,781,280	3.6575%
Teli	3,677,491	2.8131%
Mallah (Nishad)	3,410,093	2.6086%
Nonia	2,498,474	1.9112%
Kanu	2,892,761	2.2129%
Bania	3,026,912	2.3155%
Bhumihar	3,750,886	2.87%
Rajput	4,510,733	3.4505%
Dushadh	6,943,000	5.3111%
Musahar	4,035,787	3.0872%
Kayastha	785,771	0.6011%
Ravidas	6,869,664	5.2550%
Tanti	2,228,353	1.7%
Nai	2,082,048	1.59%

- As per, 2011 Census of India, Scheduled Castes constitute 16% of Bihar's 104 million population. The census identified 21 of 23 Dalit sub-castes as Mahadalits. Mahadalit community consists of the following sub castes - Bantar, Bauri, Bhogta, Bhuiya, Chaupal, Dabgar, Dom (Dhangad), Ghasi, Halalkhor, Hari (Mehtar, Bhangi), Kanjar, Kurariar, Lalbegi, Musahar, Nat, Pan (Swasi), Rajwar, Turi, Dhobi, Pasi, Chamar and Paswan (Dusadh). Paswan caste was initially left out of the Mahadalit category. Adivasis (Scheduled Tribes) constitute around 1.3% of Bihar population. Tribals include Gond, Santhal and Tharu communities in Bihar.
- Extremely Backward Class (EBCs) are also sometimes referred to as Most Backward Class(MBCs). There are 130-odd EBC castes in Bihar.

== Languages ==
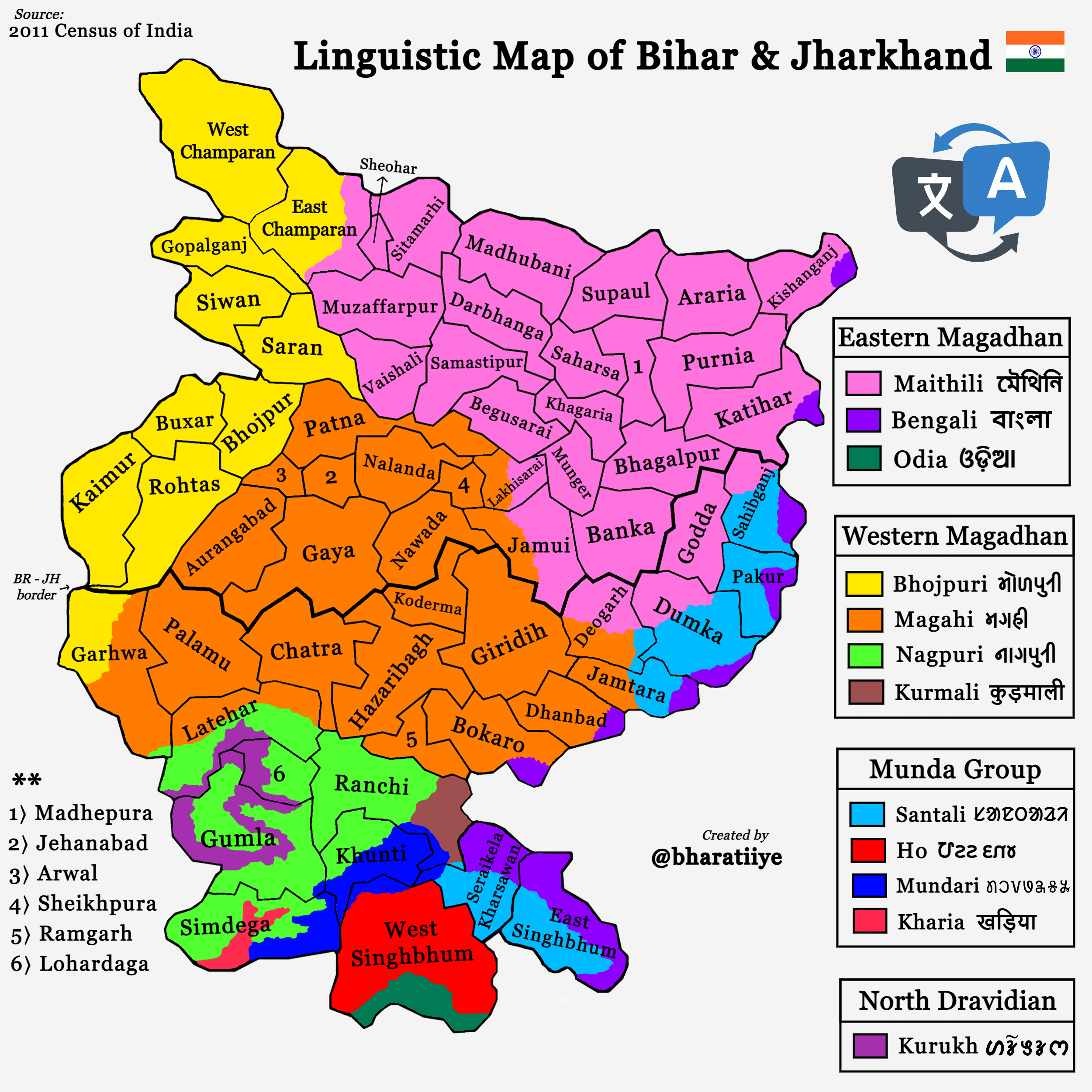
Linguistic map of Bihar and Jharkhand detailed

Languages of Bihar (2011)
1. Hindi (25.5%)
2. Bhojpuri (24.9%)
3. Maithili (12.6%)
4. Magahi (10.9%)
5. Urdu (8.42%)
6. Surjapuri (1.78%)
7. Others (16.0%)

Hindi and Urdu are the official languages of the state.

Maithili language is the only language of Bihar which is one of the 22 Scheduled language of India.

Bhojpuri, Magahi, and Surjapuri are counted under Hindi. Proponents have called for Bhojpuri, Magahi, Bajjika and Angika to receive the same status.

== Education ==
Education in Bihar (2001)
Level	Persons	Male	Female
Literate without educational	1,715,049	1,109,731	605,318
Below Primary	7,890,329	4,754,137	3,136,192
Primary	8,334,709	5,130,917	3,203,792
Middle	4,390,226	3,012,151	1,378,075
Secondary	4,751,560	3,439,918	1,311,642
Higher Secondary	1,826,093	1,385,282	440,811
Technical Diploma	24,989	20,088	4,901
Non-technical Diploma	48,532	40,458	8,074
Graduate & above	2,109,415	1,737,651	371,764
Unclassified	18,675	14,043	4,632

Bihar has a total literacy rate of 70.9%. Overall Male and Female literacy rate is 79.7% and 60.5% respectively. Total Rural literacy rate is 43.9%. In rural areas of Bihar, Male and Female literacy rate is 57.1 and 29.6 respectively. Total Urban literacy rate is 71.9. In urban areas of Bihar, Male and Female literacy rate is 79.9 and 62.6 respectively. . Total number of literates in Bihar is 3,16,75,607 which consists of 2,09,78,955 Male and 1,06,96,652 Female. Patna has highest Literacy Rate of 63.82% followed by Rohtas (62.36%) and Munger (60.11%). Kishanganj has lowest Literacy Rate of 31.02% followed by Araria (34.94%) and Katihar (35.29%).

== Districts ==
Districtwise Demographics (2001)
Districts of Bihar	Population			Growth rate		Sex ratio		Population density	
Districts of Bihar	Total 2001	Males 2001	Females 2001	1981–91	1991–2001	1991	2001	1991	2001
West Champaran	3,043,044	1,600,853	1,442,191	18.30	30.40	877	901	446	582
East Champaran	3,933,636	2,072,350	1,861,286	25.46	29.27	883	898	767	991
Sheohar	514,288	271,261	243,027	27.34	36.16	876	896	853	1,161
Sitamarhi	2,669,887	1,410,149	1,259,738	23.13	32.58	884	893	915	1,214
Madhubani	3,570,651	1,837,361	1,733,290	21.76	26.08	932	943	809	1,020
Supaul	1,745,069	908,855	836,214	23.45	29.95	904	920	557	724
Araria	2,124,831	1,108,924	1,015,907	26.69	31.84	907	916	569	751
Kishanganj	1,294,063	666,910	627,153	22.20	31.50	933	940	522	687
Purnia	2,540,788	1,325,794	1,214,994	23.76	35.23	903	916	582	787
Katihar	2,389,533	1,244,943	1,144,590	27.77	30.91	909	919	597	782
Madhepura	1,524,596	796,272	728,324	22.16	29.45	885	915	659	853
Saharsa	1,506,418	788,585	717,833	25.54	33.03	884	910	665	885
Darbhanga	3,285,473	1,716,640	1,568,833	25.04	30.85	911	914	1,102	1,442
Muzaffarpur	3,743,836	1,941,480	1,802,356	25.30	26.74	904	928	931	1,180
Gopalganj	2,149,343	1,072,151	1,077,192	25.12	26.11	968	1,005	838	1,057
Siwan district	2,708,840	1,332,218	1,376,622	22.04	24.78	1,017	1,033	978	1,221
Saran	3,251,474	1,654,428	1,597,046	23.44	26.37	963	965	974	1,231
Vaishali	2,712,389	1,412,276	1,300,113	29.08	26.39	921	921	1,054	1,332
Samastipur	3,413,413	1,771,249	1,642,164	28.35	25.63	926	927	936	1,175
Begusarai	2,342,989	1,226,057	1,116,932	24.61	29.11	898	911	946	1,222
Khagaria	1,276,677	675,501	601,176	28.44	29.32	868	890	664	859
Bhagalpur	2,430,331	1,294,192	1,136,139	20.67	27.24	864	878	743	946
Banka	1,608,778	843,061	765,717	24.44	24.47	893	908	428	533
Munger	1,135,499	604,662	530,837	17.79	20.34	856	878	665	800
Lakhisarai	801,173	416,727	384,446	21.08	23.94	880	923	526	652
Sheikhpura	525,137	273,468	251,669	19.84	24.96	896	920	610	762
Nalanda	2,368,327	1,236,467	1,131,860	21.73	18.64	898	915	848	1,006
Patna	4,709,851	2,514,949	2,194,902	19.84	30.17	867	873	1,130	1,471
Bhojpur	2,233,415	1,175,333	1,058,082	20.26	24.58	904	900	725	903
Buxar	1,403,462	738,239	665,223	18.63	29.03	884	901	670	864
Kaimur	1,284,575	673,556	611,019	24.20	30.64	884	907	292	382
Rohtas	2,448,762	1,282,655	1,166,107	21.77	27.71	894	909	498	636
Jehanabad	1,511,406	783,960	727,446	19.43	28.64	919	928	749	963
Aurangabad	2,004,960	1,035,757	969,203	24.49	30.19	915	936	466	607
Gaya	3,464,983	1,789,231	1,675,752	23.92	30.03	922	937	536	696
Nawada	1,809,425	928,638	880,787	23.70	33.08	936	948	545	726
Jamui	1,397,474	728,812	668,662	21.90	32.90	903	917	339	451

== Miscellaneous statistics ==
As of 2001, Bihar had 212,015 international migrants and 1,619,031 inter-state migrants.

== See also ==
- Bihar caste-based survey 2023
- Demographics of India
- Demographics of Asia
