= 2024 Telangana Social Educational Employment Economic Caste Survey =

Indian state-wide survey

Telangana 2024 Social Educational Employment Economic Caste Survey
- Date: 6 November 2024 – December 2024
- Location: Telangana, India
- Participants: 94,863 enumerators, 9,628 supervisors
- Outcome: Covered 96.9% of households, guiding welfare policies

The Telangana 2024 Social Educational Employment Economic Caste Survey (SEEEPC) was a state-wide initiative by the Government of Telangana to gather detailed data on caste, education, employment, income, and political engagement. Launched on 6 November 2024, it surveyed 96.9% of households, approximately 1.12 million, to inform policies for marginalised groups such as Backward Classes, Scheduled Castes, and Scheduled Tribes. Released on 3 February 2025, the findings showed Backward Classes comprising 56.33% of the population, shaping discussions on social equity and reservations.

== Background ==
The SEEEPC survey was authorised by the Telangana Legislative Assembly on 16 February 2024, following a Council of Ministers decision on 4 February 2024. Driven by the Indian National Congress-led government's commitment to social justice, the survey aimed to address gaps in caste-based data since the 2011 Census of India. Chief minister Revanth Reddy hailed it as a transformative step, potentially influencing national demographic studies.

The initiative sought to create a robust dataset to support targeted welfare programs, focusing on socio-economic and political inclusion for Telangana's 35.4 million residents.

== Methodology ==
The survey commenced with household visits starting 6 November 2024, inaugurated by Backward Classes Welfare Minister Ponnam Prabhakar at the Greater Hyderabad Municipal Corporation (GHMC) office. Data collection, intensified from 9 November 2024, concluded within 50 days, reaching 96.9% of households.

=== Implementation ===
- Scope: It covered 1.12 million households, totaling 35,477,554 individuals across 94,261 enumeration blocks.
- Personnel: The effort involved 94,863 enumerators, 9,628 supervisors, and 76,000 data entry operators, who digitized records in 36 days.
- Tools: Enumerators used dual-section forms to collect details on caste, religion, income, employment, education, and welfare scheme access.
- Oversight: The state planning department coordinated the process, with nodal officers and Zonal Commissioners ensuring data integrity.

=== Obstacles ===
Challenges included 103,000 inaccessible homes, 168,000 reluctant households, and 84,137 incorrectly classified residences. Districts like Jangaon and Mulugu achieved full coverage, while GHMC reached 65%.

== Findings ==
Announced on 3 February 2025, the survey's results, submitted to a Cabinet sub-committee, detailed Telangana's demographic composition:

Demographic Breakdown by Caste
Category	Percentage	Population
Backward Classes (BC)	46.33%	19,985,767
Scheduled Castes (SC)	17.43%	6,184,319
Scheduled Tribes (ST)	10.45%	3,705,929
Other Castes (OC)	15.79%	5,421,115
Muslim Population	12.56%	4,457,012
BC Muslims	10.08%	3,576,588
OC Muslims	2.48%	—

The data, gathered voluntarily and confidentially, spanned 75 fields, offering a granular view of socio-economic conditions.

== Implications ==
Telangana Minister N. Uttam Kumar Reddy described the survey as a landmark study, unmatched in rigour since India's independence. An 11 member expert panel, chaired by former Supreme Court Justice B. Sudershan Reddy, was tasked with analysing the data to recommend policies.

The results are poised to expand reservation quotas in education, employment, and politics, potentially exceeding the 50% limit, as pushed by Chief Minister Reddy. The survey's approach has fuelled calls for a nationwide caste census, positioning Telangana as a model.

== Reception ==
The survey's rapid execution, covering 841,000 GHMC households by 17 November 2024, earned widespread notice. It advanced Congress's social justice agenda, though some opposition figures were critiqued for relying on outdated statistics. The Telangana Legislative Assembly highlighted the survey's policy potential before adjourning on 5 February 2025.

== See also ==
- Caste system in India
- Reservation in India
- 2011 Census of India
- 2022 Bihar caste-based survey
