= Ramgarh, Siwan =

Village in Siwan

Ramgarh रामगढ़
- Gram Panchayat
- Location within Bihar Location within India
- Coordinates: 25.9781°N 84.4285°E
- Country: India
- State: Bihar
- District: Siwan district
- Block: Siswan

Government
  - Type: Local Government
  - Body: Panchayati Raj
  - Panchayat: Ramgarh
  - Mukhiya: Chanda Bharati

Area
  - Total: 3.65 km^{2} (1.41 sq mi)
- Elevation: 57 m (187 ft)

Population (2011 Census)
  - Total: 6,684
  - Density: 1,830/km^{2} (4,740/sq mi)

Languages
  - Official: Hindi & English
  - Regional: Bhojpuri

Demographics
  - Literacy: 55.36% Males: (68.62%); Females:(41.19%)
  - Sex ratio: 912
- Time zone: UTC+5:30 (IST)
- PIN: 841203
- ISO 3166 code: IN-BR
- Vehicle registration: BR29
- Website: siwan.nic.in

Ramgarh is a gram panchayat located in the Siswan block of Siwan district in the state of Bihar, India. The village is situated near the Daha River.

== History ==
The history of the village is intrinsically linked to the legend of this ancient Shiva temple, which dates back to the 17th century. According to local legend, the temple's story begins with King Mahendra Vir Vikram Sahdeo of Nepal. The king was suffering from a skin disease and was on his way to Varanasi to bathe in the holy Ganges River for a cure. While passing through a dense forest (the site of present-day Siwan), he stopped to rest under a peepal tree. As he searched for water, he found a small ditch. When he washed his hands with the water, his disease was miraculously cured. That night, Lord Shiva appeared to the king in a dream and told him to excavate the area under the peepal tree and build a temple there. The king followed the divine instructions, and a shivalinga (a representation of Lord Shiva) was unearthed. He then built the temple on that very spot. He also had a large pond dug next to the temple, known as the 52 Beegha Pond, which is believed to have healing properties.

== Geography ==
According to government records, the village code of Ramgarh is 232794. The total geographical area of Ramgarh village is 365 hectares. The village has 1,268 houses.

== Demographics ==
The 2011 Census of India recorded Ramgarh village in Bihar with a population of 6,684, comprising 3,497 males and 3,187 females, spread across 23 households. The village has a notable literacy rate of 55.36%, with 2,533 literate males and 1,895 literate females. The sex ratio in Ramgarh is 912, indicating a below-average ratio compared to the national average of 940.

=== Age distribution ===
Children aged 0–6 years number 1,054, accounting for 15.77% of the total population of this village. The child sex ratio is 873 females for every 1,000 males.

=== Literacy ===
According to the 2011 Census, the literacy rate in Ramgarh is 55.36%. The male literacy rate is 68.62%, while the female literacy rate is 41.19%

== Villages in panchayat ==
Here the list of the village name which is in the Ramgarh Panchayat.

- Pipra
- Nagai
- Birti Lakheraj
- Birti
- Menhdar
- Nagai Khas
- Nirmal Nagai

== See also ==
- Siswan
- Siwan district
- Panchayati raj (India)
- List of villages in Siwan district
- Siwan subdivision
- Administration in Bihar
- Daraunda Assembly constituency
- Siwan Lok Sabha constituency
