= Bihar State Electronics Development Corporation =

Electronics Development in Bihar

Bihar State Electronics Development Corporation Ltd. (BELTRON)
- Type: Statutory board
- Founded: 2010
- Headquarters: Beltron Bhawan, Baldev Bhawan Rd, Shastri Nagar, Patna, India
- Area served: Bihar
- Key people: Santosh Kumar Mall (Managing Director)
- Number of employees: 14,850 (2022)
- Parent: IT Department, Government of Bihar
- Website: bsedc.bihar.gov.in

Bihar State Electronics Development Corporation Ltd. (BELTRON) is a Government of Bihar undertaking. BELTRON is an executive wing of the state IT department and handles Government of Bihar's technological needs. It works to promote the electronics hardware manufacturing and IT industry and provide high quality, service-oriented consultancy services within Bihar.

BELTRON recruits employees in the departments of Government of Bihar, when requisition is sought from BELTRON by the departments. Beltron Recruitment Processes conducts exams to fill the posts like Data Entry Operator, Stenographer, Programmer in Government Departments of Bihar.

In 2016, BELTRON provided free Wi-Fi service in over 300 colleges and nine universities of Bihar. In 2021, BELTRON developed an innovative Home Isolation Tracking (HIT) app under the guidance of the health department, during COVID-19 pandemic in India. HIT app keeps an eye on the condition of COVID patients recuperating at their residence. BELTRON is providing IT support for Bihar caste-based survey 2023, and hired the services of a Maharashtra-based private firm Trigyn Technologies to develop the mobile app- Bijaga (Bihar Jaati Adharit Ganana), which is available on Google Play. It host the data on cloud.

== See also ==
- Department of Science and Technology, Bihar
- National Informatics Centre
- Bharat Broadband Network
