= Sainthwar =

Indian caste

The Sainthwar, or Mall, is an Indian caste of peasants native to the Uttar Pradesh state. Under the Indian governments system of positive discrimination, the Sainthwars are classified as a "Backward" or Other backward class.

The Sainthwars are closely related to the Kurmis, and are sometimes described as a division of the Kurmi caste. Though Sainthwars deny the claim but in Census of 1881 Sainthwars were mentioned along with Kurmi in Oudh and Benaras. Sainthwar was earlier a Kurmi sub-caste. But due to the rise of the leading family (princely family of Padruna) it was classified as a separate caste in 1911. The Sainthwars are known as "Mall" ("prosperous") as opposed to the Kurmis. They are the dominant landholding caste in some districts of Uttar Pradesh.

The oral tradition of the Sainthwars traces their ancestry to Chandraketu, a son of the legendary hero Lakshmana.

Bharatiya Janata Party politician RPN Singh belongs to the Saithwar community and is a prominent leader from Eastern Uttar Pradesh.
