= Information and Public Relations Department, Bihar =

Indian state government agency

Information and Public Relations Department, Government of Bihar
- सूचना एवं जनसंपर्क विभाग, बिहार सरकार

Agency overview
- Jurisdiction: Bihar
- Headquarters: Patna
- Minister responsible: Shrawan Kumar
- Agency executives: Sri Navin Kumar, IAS, Secretary; Anil Kumar, IAS, Director; Ravi Bhushan Sahay, BIS, Joint Director
- Website: state.bihar.gov.in/prdbihar

The Information and Public Relations Department, Bihar commonly referred as IPRD Bihar is an agency within the Government of Bihar. Based in Soochna Bhavan Patna. It is charged to liaison with the press, issues of press notes on behalf of government, review of tone and tenor of Hindi, English and Urdu Newspaper published in the State and the department also helps in disseminating information on various activities of the government to the people through the media and providing feedback to the government on important matters reflected in the media. IPRD is also charged with activities connected with cultural affairs.

== Functions ==
The main functions of the Information and Public Relations Department are to organise visit of press representatives to different areas, accreditation of press representatives and issue of certificates, publication and display of classified advertisements in newspaper and centralized payment of bills, publications of publicity literature in different languages regarding the achievements and development programmes of the Government, publicity of the achievements of the government within and outside the state through cultural programme. It also disseminate and propagate government policies, programmes, schemes and achievements, effectively for public awareness. Documentation of progress and achievements of various department. It also helps the state government to make coordination with various department by knowing and understanding the mood, perception and feedback of people on different issues by analysis of news published in the media and to arrange quick response of government's view point among general public through media as necessary, disseminate policies, programmes and achievements of various departments for educating people and mass communication by performing role of facilitator by using various, method and resources of educating people and mass communication. Formation of creativeness for publicity of programmes, schemes and achievements of various departments through poster, pamphlet, folder, booklet, etc. and to facilitate the advertisement work.
