= Kahar =

Community from the Gangatic region

The Kahars are a community of palanquin bearers originating from the Gangetic region in India.

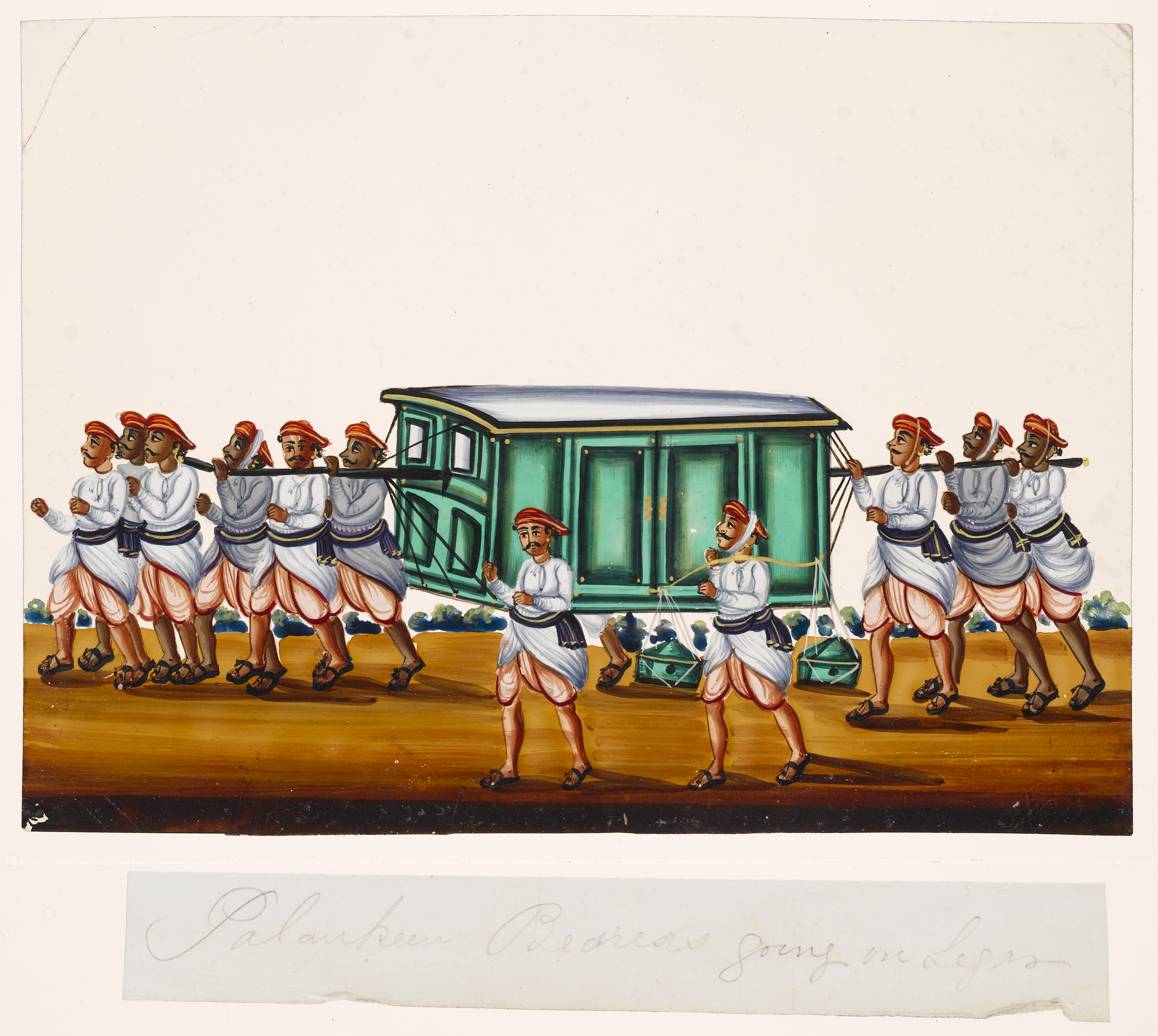
Palanquin Bearers, India. Circa 19th-century

Kahars are present in most parts of India, but are concentrated in North India. They are found mainly in West Uttar Pradesh, in Sarsawa, Saharanpur, Farrukhabad, Kanpur, Muzaffarnagar, Shahjahanpur, Sultanpur, Faizabad, Jaunpur and Ambedkar Nagar districts of Uttar Pradesh and most parts of Bihar and West Bengal. They were engaged to officiate at the various holy occasions which occur along the banks of the Ganges river.

== Classification ==
Kahars are currently classified as Other Backward Class in the state of Uttar Pradesh. In the recent time, Kahar community of Uttar Pradesh has been demanding inclusion into Schedule Caste category from the Other Backward Caste category.

== Subdivisions ==
Kahar has been described as a social community rather than a caste. It is formed by coming together of several castes and tribes, who shared the same traditional occupation.

The traditional occupation of Kahars has primarily been palanquin bearing but they have also worked as water carriers and water chestnut farmers in Uttar Pradesh and Bihar. On these occupational grounds, they are divided in eleven sub-clans. These are Bhoi, Dhimar, Dhuriya, Guria, Gond, Kaleni, Kamlethar, Hurka, Machhera, Mahara, Panbhara and Singhariya.

In Rajasthan, the Kahars have three sub-divisions, the Budana and Turaha. These sub-divisions consist of clans, the main ones being the Pindwal, Bamnawat, Katariya, Bilawat, Kashyap and Oatasaniya. The origins of most of these sub-divisions are rooted in Rajasthan.
