= Dhanuk =

Ethnic group of India

Regions with significant populations
- India and Nepal
- Bihar: 2,796,605

Languages
- • Hindi • Maithili • Bhojpuri

Religion
- Predominantly: Hinduism

The Dhanuk are an ethnic group found in India. In Bihar, where they are present in significant numbers, they are classified among the "lower backwards", along with several other castes, together comprising approximately 2.13% of the state's population. In recent years, the community has experienced increased political representation. In Bihar, Dhanuks are often considered a sub-caste of the Mandal caste and frequently use Mandal as a surname. In parts of Uttar Pradesh, particularly from Kanpur Dehat northward to Etawah, Kannauj, and Agra, Katheria is a commonly used surname.

In recent times, there have been efforts to forge a socio-political alliance between the Dhanuks and the Koeri and Kurmi castes as a part of the so-called Luv-Kush political equation. However, these castes generally do not recognise the Dhanuks as part of their grouping.

== Distribution ==
Dhanuks are found in the Indian states of Bihar, Haryana, Rajasthan and Uttar Pradesh. In Rajasthan, the Dhanka community claims that its name is a variant of Dhanuk and that both represent the same community, though the accuracy of this claim is difficult to verify due to competing narratives. These claims sometimes conflict with those of Madheshi group found in Nepal's Terai region. In Rajasthan, a community known as Dhanuk or Dhanushk traditionally worked as watchmen.

== Culture and tradition ==
=== Oral traditions ===
Like many other aspirational communities in India, the Dhanuk community has engaged in the process of Sanskritisation by identifying a community hero within epic and historic narratives. This led them to adopt Panna Dhai as their central figure. According to historical legend, Panna Dhai was a nursemaid in the kingdom of Mewar who sacrificed her own son, Chandan, to save the life of the infant prince and future ruler, Uday Singh.

The legend of Panna Dhai has evolved into a significant narrative of honour and glory among the Dhanuk, particularly within particular regions of Uttar Pradesh. The community, concentrated in Kanpur, Ettawah, Farrukhabad, Manipuri and surrounding areas, formally celebrates the anniversary of Panna Dhai. Social historian Badri Narayan notes that the legends surrounding Panna Dhai provide the community with a historical anchor to consolidate and strengthen their "caste identity".

=== Tracing own identity ===
Anthropologist Megan Moodie narrates the caste history of Dhanuks, who is known by different names such as Dhanka, Dhanak, and Dhanakiya in different parts of India, through a pamphlet published by the community itself. According to their accounts, Dhanuk people claim that they have a special position among all castes and trace the origin of the history of the word "Dhanak" from the scriptures like Rig Veda and Puranas. The community history claims that they were warring tribes who used to wear Dhanush (bow and arrow) in the ancient past. In the medieval period, they claim to have helped the Rajput kings in the fight against Mughals. Consequently, with the defeat of Hindu Rajas, they were harassed by the other rulers including the Mughals and this led them to migrate to the different parts of the country which include present-day Himachal Pradesh, Bihar and Uttar Pradesh.

As described by them, they have roots in Rajasthan and several of their customs and traditions have Rajput influence. Some of the customs like taking the ring and jewelry of the bride and groom's striking ornamental archway reflect the impact of Rajput influence. The Dhanuk people claim that their ancestors in Rajasthan worked upon the bamboo to make bows and arrows, as well as baskets. They also depended upon other minor forest products for their livelihood and widespread deforestation in the later periods left them with no other choice to shift towards other subsistence activities. Those who moved to other states were employed in the grain market and started working as the cleaner of grains (Dhan) and also provided cheap labour to transport it from the market to its destination. Presumably, the association with the grain market brought them the name with which they were known later. Further, the occupational diversity in Dhanuks was much more pronounced than in the other castes who were fixed in a predetermined Varnasharma setup. The Dhanuks and the other associated subcastes also claim to have worked as water carriers, musicians, guards, shepherds, and agricultural labourers.

This claim is also supported by the accounts of William Crooke, who in his book Caste and Tribes of Northwestern India describes Dhanuks as people working as water carriers, guards, and musicians in marriages. Crooke also reveals several other synonyms used to describe this caste as Dhankara, Katheriya, Kedi, and Ravar. Bushman has described them as Martial race while Ispel has described them as "Dhanush wielding people", who later converted into guards, hunters, and weavers. Some people also think that Dhanak was a Rishi and his followers were later known as Dhanka/Dhanuk.

== In India ==
=== Bihar ===
The Dhanuk of Bihar are deemed to be an Other Backward Class in India's reservation system. In the early phase of history, this cast was said to be a warrior caste. They were frontline warriors who used bows and arrows as their weapons. But the consequent defeat in a series of wars forced them into slavery and forced them to be engaged in different kinds of occupation. Because they had not enough land, they started work as agricultural labourers.

In the 19th century, Dhanuks were among the communities of the region whose landless members were employed as agricultural labourers. Such labourers were considered slaves under the kamia system and were often referred to as Jotiyas. The Dhanuks had largely escaped the system towards the end of the century. Many of the former slave workers took up lowly positions in the industries and commerce of the developing towns, aided by improvements in transport, but were ultimately no better off either economically or socially.

=== Haryana ===
The Dhanak of Haryana, is a community of weavers. They have been granted Scheduled Caste status in the reservation system, and are found throughout the state.

=== Uttar Pradesh ===
In Uttar Pradesh, Dhanuks are given Scheduled Caste status and at the time of the 2011 Census of India, their population was 651,355 people.

There is some ambiguity in the use of the term dhanuk in the state. As per some scholars, this cast was largely associated with the scheduled tribe Bhil. However, some scholars, like Professor Susan Wadley, have described the Dhanuk as a "midwife caste". Janet Chawla has noted that using the term for midwives "highlights the idea that birth-related work, indeed vitally important bodywork can be part of the same matrix of tasks". From many years valmiki (caste in India) claims dhanuk as their sub caste and hence use "dhanuk" as their surname in parts of western up, hence have been equated to trash related works.

Sarah Pinto, an anthropologist has noted that most people are engaged in agricultural work. She believes that there is an "overidentification of caste with iconic labour", and is more a reflection of the worldviews of both Brahmins and the later British colonizers than of reality.

== Dhanuks in Nepal ==
The Central Bureau of Statistics of Nepal classifies the Dhanuk as a subgroup within the broader social group of Terai Janajati. At the time of the Nepal census of 2011, 219,808 people (0.8% of the population of Nepal) were Dhanuk. The frequency of Dhanuks by province was as follows:

- Madhesh Province (3.5%)
- Koshi Province (0.6%)
- Bagmati Province (0.0%)
- Gandaki Province (0.0%)
- Lumbini Province (0.0%)
- Sudurpashchim Province (0.0%)
- Karnali Province (0.0%)

The frequency of Dhanuks was higher than the national average (0.8%) in the following districts:

- Mahottari (6.5%)
- Saptari (6.5%)
- Dhanusha (5.0%)
- Siraha (3.7%)
- Bara (2.9%)
- Parsa (1.8%)
- Sarlahi (1.6%)
- Sunsari (1.6%)
- Morang (1.2%)
