= Dangi people =

Hindu caste native to northern India

Dangi
Regions with significant populations
- India
- Rajasthan Madhya pradesh Bihar Nepal: 336,629 (0.2575% of Bihar's population)

Religion
- Hinduism

The Dangi are an agricultural Hindu caste native to northern India. Their traditional occupation is farming. They speak several languages, but Hindi is the most commonly understood language among them.

The Ministry of Social Justice and Empowerment informed Indian parliament in early 2024 that it had not received any representation from the Government of Rajasthan for the inclusion of Patidar, Patel and Dangi communities in India's central Other Backward Class list. This was in response to an MP's question regaring any such recommendation made by Rajasthan.
