= Kandu =

Caste found in Nepal and northern India

Kanu
- Varna: Vaishya
- Jāti: Kanu/Baniya
- Kuladevta (male): Baba Ganinath ji Maharaj
- Religions: Hindu Hinduism
- Country: India • Nepal
- Original state: Bihar • Jharkhand • West Bengal • Uttar Pradesh • Purvanchal area of Uttar pradesh
- Populated states: Bihar, Uttar Pradesh, and Madhesh Province (Nepal)
- Family names: Sah, Gupta, Mahajan, Seth
- Endogamous: Yes
- Related groups: Baniya
- Historical grouping: Vaishya

'Kanu' or Kandu is a Baniya or Vaishya caste that has been historically associated with trading activities-- sweet-making, shop-keeping, trading etc. in India and Nepal. One of their notable business activities is confectionery.

They have been associated with the states Bihar, Jharkhand, West Bengal, Uttar Pradesh, Purvanchal area of Uttar pradesh and Nepal (Madhesi region) Like many other Bania communities, they are undergoing urbanisation. Many rural Kanu’s are shopkeepers and trader. They have a state wise caste association, the Kanu Vaishya Mahasabha, which act as a both as an instrument of social control as well as communal welfare association.

== Present condition in India ==
The community has been given the status of OBC at the all India level and BC-I in the state of Bihar for reservation purposes.

Their population in Bihar (as per the caste survey of 2023) is around 2.21%. When it comes to political representation in Bihar and elsewhere, the community is not adequately represented. Given their population size and social standing, the community has been demanding political representation on a large scale.
