= Lonia =

Hindu caste

Noniya
Lonia
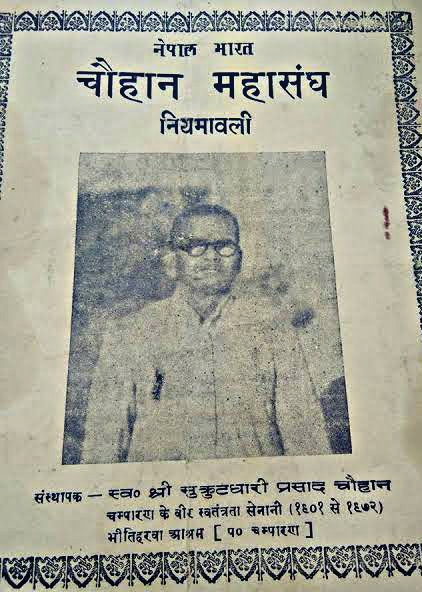

Total population
- 70 Lakhs

Regions with significant populations
- India
- Bihar: 2.0 percent of Bihar's population

Languages
- Hindi; Bhojpuri; Magahi; Maithili

Religion
- Hinduism

Related ethnic groups
- Noniya • Lonia • Lonari • Beldar

The Lonia are a Hindu other backward caste, found in Uttar Pradesh and Bihar adjoining areas, who were traditionally involved in salt-digging and salt-making activities. The Lonia are listed as extremely backward caste, along with the Mallaah, Bind and Beldar communities, by state governments. The community leaders have been seeking Scheduled Tribe status for the socially deprived community. It is also spelled as Lunia, or Nonia.

== Surnames ==
People of this casts have various surnames usually depending on which part of country they are from. They use 'Chauhan', 'Prasad', 'Mehto', 'Nuniya', 'Singh Chauhan', 'Jamedar', 'Loniya', 'Beldar'. Women usually have 'Devi' in their surname if they don't use their husband's surname.

== Role in the Indian independence movement ==
Mukutdhari Prasad Chauhan, a member of the Noniya caste, played a key role in the Indian independence movement. He was involved in the Champaran Satyagraha, the 1930 Salt Satyagraha, and the 1942 Quit India Movement.

Against the unjust salt tax law imposed by the British, Mahatma Gandhi undertook a 390-kilometer-long Dandi March from Sabarmati, breaking the oppressive salt law. Following this, in response to Gandhi’s call, the Salt Satyagraha movement spread across the country, leading to widespread defiance of the law.

In Bihar’s Garhpura, under the leadership of the great freedom fighter "Bihar Kesari" Dr. Shrikrishna Sinha (Shribabu), the salt law was broken in the Garhpura village of Begusarai subdivision, then part of Munger district. Bindeshwari Singh and Banarasi Singh played a leading role in this movement. Local artisan Buddhu Nonia and some other Nonia craftsmen assisted in making salt.

Efforts are underway to preserve the historical and glorious legacy of both Dandi and Garhpura.

The Salt Movement, led by Gandhi, played a crucial role in India's freedom struggle, with freedom fighters like Mukutdhari Chauhan the Nonia community and other Indian salt workers made significant contributions.

== Origins and status ==
Their population is concentrated in the eastern part of Uttar Pradesh such as Ghazipur, Azamgarh, Mau districts and some neighbouring areas. Lonia or Nonia like other communities, had been victim of colonial oppression, which resulted in rebellion and they contributed to the fight for independence.
In recent times, they have started writing Chauhan as their surname and calling themselves Rajput, which has no historical basis or evidence, as scholars have given examples of entire communities of Shudra origin "becoming" Rajput, termed as Rajputisation, even as late as the 20th century, under British Raj, for instance, William Rowe, in his "The new Chauhans : A caste mobility movement in North India", discusses an example of a large section of a Shudra caste - the Noniyas or Lonias- from Madhya Pradesh, Uttar Pradesh and Bihar that had tried to "become" Rajputs over three generations in the Raj era to seek upper mobility in the social hierarchy by emulating their customs and traditions.

== Present circumstances ==
The Lonia or Nonia are one of the most socially, educationally and economically deprived communities, though recognised as OBCs by state governments, they have been seeking Scheduled Tribe status, for their upliftment.

== Notable people ==
- Kailash Purryag, fifth president of Mauritius.
- Fagu Chauhan, Governor of Meghalaya.
- Bharrat Jagdeo, former president of Guyana.
- Renu Devi former deputy CM of Bihar

== Sources ==
- Lloyd Rudolph (1967). The Modernity of Tradition: Political Development in India. University of Chicago Press. ISBN 978-0-226-73137-7.
