= List of villages in Siwan district =

Siwan district of Bihar, India comprises only one sub-division, Siwan, which is divided into 19 Blocks and has a total of 1,530 villages. There are 95 uninhabited villages (out of 1,530 total villages) in the district of Siwan.

This is list of villages of Siwan district according to respective blocks.

== Andar ==
1. Ailashgarh Khas
2. Amnaura
3. Andar
4. Arakpur
5. Arazi Barwa
6. Asaon
7. Balia
8. Bangra
9. Belahi
10. Bhaurajpur
11. Bhitauli
12. Bikrampur Diara
13. Chandauli
14. Chhajwa
15. Chitaur
16. Dehunra
17. Deuriya
18. Dharamkhor
19. Diara Ailashgarh Naubarar
20. Diara Maniara Tukra 1
21. Doaen
22. Fatehpur
23. Fazilpur
24. Fazilpur Deuriya
25. Gahilapur
26. Gaura
27. Ghataila
28. Hakma Hata
29. Hujhujipur
30. Jaijor
31. Jamalpur
32. Kanhpakar
33. Katwar
34. Khardara
35. Khartari urf Hariram chak
36. Kherhai
37. Khodai chak
38. Kismat Barwa
39. Kodaila
40. Mahaji Gondauni
41. Mahammadpur
42. Manpur Pateji
43. Masudaha
44. Mirpur
45. Modassilpur
46. Moglanipur
47. Nahuni
48. Pachokhar
49. Pandapali
50. Parari Lachchhiram
51. Pareji
52. Patar
53. Pateji
54. Pipra
55. Pirari Khemraj
56. Rakauli
57. Rakauli Khap
58. Sadalpur
59. Sahsaraon
60. Salahpur
61. Sanchipur
62. Siuri
63. Sonkara Auwal
64. Sonkara sani
65. Sultanpur
66. Tiae
67. Utarwar

== Barharia ==
1. Ahirni
2. Alampur
3. Alapur
4. Asapur
5. Athkhambha
6. Aurai
7. Babhan Bara
8. Babu Hata
9. Babu Hata
10. Badarzamin
11. Bahadurpur
12. Bahuara qadir
13. Balapur
14. Bangra
15. Bangra Buzurg
16. Barahpur
17. Barharia
18. Barsara
19. Bhabhopali
20. Bhaday
21. Bhagwanpur
22. Bhalua
23. Bhalui
24. Bhaluwara
25. Bhelpur
26. Bhimpur
27. Bhopatpur
28. Bishambharpur
29. Bishunpura
30. Chain Chhapra
31. Chainpur Alinagar
32. Chak Pararauna
33. Chandan Chhapra
34. Chanri
35. Chap Kanhauli
36. Chaukihasan Chauki Makhdum
37. Chhaka Tola
38. Chhatisi
39. Daniayl-pur
40. Dhanaon
41. Dharajpur
42. Dumri
43. Enaetchhapra
44. Fakhrudinpur
45. Gambhir Hata
46. GhausiAhata
47. Girddharpur
48. Gopalpur
49. Habibpur
50. Hardiya
51. Hardo Bara
52. Hariharpur Lalgarh
53. Harpur
54. Hathgain
55. Indauli Khas
56. Indauli Siraj
57. Jagarnathpur
58. Jagatpur
59. Jagdishpur
60. Jiadi Tola
61. Jogapur
62. Kail
63. Kaluchhapra
64. Kanahar
65. Kanhauli
66. Khanpur
67. Khizar Chak
68. Khori Pakar Jaddi
69. Khori Pakar Nilami
70. Koiri Tola
71. Kuahi
72. Kurwa
73. Kurwa
74. Kutub Chhapra
75. Lachhmi Chak
76. Lakri
77. Lakri Dargah
78. Lala Hata
79. Lauan
80. Madhaupur
81. Mahal
82. Mahamadpur
83. Mahammadpur
84. Mahbub Chhapra
85. Mahmudpur
86. Mananpura
87. Mansahata
88. Mathia Patarhatha
89. Mathurapur
90. Mira Chhapra
91. Narharpur
92. Nasir Chhapra
93. Nasopur Saraia
94. Nawalpur
95. Nirkhi Chhapra
96. Paharpur
97. Paintalis
98. Pakri
99. Pakri Sultan
100. Pakwalya
101. Paltu Hata
102. Panrwa
103. Paranpur
104. Pararauna
105. Patarhatha
106. Patti Bhalua
107. Piprahi
108. Puraina
109. Qismat Surwalia
110. Rachho Pali
111. Raghunathpur
112. Rampur
113. Ranipur
114. Rasulpur
115. Rohara
116. Rudar Hata
117. Sadarpur
118. Sahba Chak
119. Salahpur
120. Sanwalhata
121. Sauna
122. Shampur
123. Shekhpura
124. Siari
125. Siari Khurd
126. Sikandarpur
127. Siswa
128. Siurajpur
129. Siurajpur
130. Sundarpur
131. Surahia
132. Surahia
133. Surwalia
134. Tetahli
135. Tilbhiriya Kalam
136. Tilbhiriya Khurd
137. Tilsandi
138. Tilsandi
139. Usri
140. Usuri Indauli
141. Wasilpur

== Basantpur ==
1. Babhnauli
2. Bagaha
3. Bagahi
4. Balthara
5. Barhoga Khurd
6. Barwa Kalan
7. Barwa Khurd
8. Basantpur
9. Basaon
10. Bishunpura
11. Dhanaua
12. Haraypur
13. Hari Aman
14. Hussepur
15. Jankinagar
16. Kanhauli
17. Karahi Kalan
18. Karahi Khurd
19. Karahi Mathia
20. Khori Pakar
21. Kukumpur
22. Laheji
23. Mathia
24. Molnapur
25. Murwar
26. Nagauli
27. Rajapur
28. Rampur
29. Sahar Kola
30. Sahilpatti
31. Sarea Sirikant
32. Sekhpura
33. Semardah
34. Seria
35. Shampur
36. Shampur Khap
37. Sipah
38. Sonurukha
39. Surajpura
40. Usri
41. Usuri

== Bhagwanpur Hat ==
1. Aiman Shankarpur
2. Arazi Balaha
3. Arazi Nagwa
4. Aruan
5. Badarzamin
6. Bagahi
7. Bahadurpur
8. Bakhtauli
9. Balaha
10. Bankajua
11. Bankat
12. Banpura
13. Bansohi
14. Baramh Asthan
15. Barka Gaon
16. Bhagwanpur Hat
17. Bherwanian
18. Bhikhampur
19. Bhikhampur
20. Bilaspur
21. Bira Bankat
22. Birt Bagahi
23. Bithuna
24. Chainpur
25. Chaiyan Pali
26. Chakbirdi
27. Chakia
28. Chakia tola
29. Chaurasi
30. Chokmunda
31. Chorauli
32. Chorauli Banwe
33. Chorman
34. Dehri
35. Dharamraj
36. Dhonrhpur
37. Dilshadpur
38. Gaziapur
39. Gobinapur
40. Goiya Nar
41. Gopalpur
42. Hasanpura
43. Hilsanr
44. Hilsanr tola
45. Hulsara
46. Jagdishpur
47. Jalpurwa
48. Juaphar
49. Juaphar tola
50. Junedpur
51. Kauriya
52. Khapkat
53. Kherhwa
54. Konrar
55. Korigawan
56. Machhagra
57. Madar Khurd
58. Maghri
59. Mahammadpur
60. Mahna
61. Mairi Dalip
62. Mairi Makhsuspur
63. Mairi Sudama
64. Makhdumpur
65. Manan Patti
66. Manrar Kalan
67. Matanpura
68. Mira Hata
69. Mirjumla
70. Mirzapur Bahiyara
71. Mohamda
72. Morakhap
73. Morakhas
74. Mundipur
75. Munra
76. Naduwa
77. Nagwa
78. Nauwa tola
79. Paniya Dih
80. Piprahia
81. Rajapur
82. Rampur
83. Rampur
84. Rampur Digar
85. Rampur Digar
86. Rampur Khas
87. Rampur Khas
88. Rampur Lauwa
89. Rasulpur
90. Ratan Panrauli
91. Ratan Panrauli
92. Ratauli
93. Sadiha
94. Saghar Sultanpur
95. Sahsa
96. Sahsaraon
97. Sajot
98. Salempur
99. Salempur
100. Sani Bagahi
101. Sankri
102. Sarahri
103. Saray Panrauli
104. Sarea
105. Saripatti
106. Shankarpur
107. Singhauli
108. Sipar
109. Sonbarsa
110. Sonhani
111. Sughri
112. Suhpur
113. Sultanpur
114. Tarwar

== Darauli ==
1. Agsara
2. Amarpur
3. Babhnauli
4. Balahu
5. Bali punak
6. Balia
7. Bandhai
8. Barheya punak
9. Basuapur
10. Bauna
11. Belaon
12. Belsui
13. Bharsanda
14. Bhitauli
15. Bhothia
16. Bilak
17. Biswania
18. Chakri
19. Chandaur
20. Daraili
21. Darauli
22. Diara Harnatanr
23. Diara Darauli
24. Diara Maniar Tukra II
25. Diara Maniar Tukra I
26. Diara Mohazi Kashidatta
27. Diara Nauabad
28. Diara kashidat
29. Diyara Keotalia
30. Diyara Mauza Amarpur
31. Dobhia
32. Don Buzurg
33. Don Khurd
34. Duba
35. Dumarahar Buzurg
36. Dumarahar Khurd
37. Dumarahar Khurd Diara
38. Dumrahar Diara
39. Extension of Bilak Diara
40. Gangpalia
41. Garden
42. Gauri
43. Gauri
44. Gopalpur
45. Gosopali
46. Gumawar
47. Harnatanr
48. Harnatanra
49. Hathauri
50. Indrak Chak
51. Kanaila
52. Kanhauli
53. Karanpura
54. Karmaha
55. Karmaul
56. Karnai
57. Karom
58. Kasihari
59. Kasila pachbenian
60. Kewtalia
61. Khairati Udho
62. Khairati Dalip
63. Khap punak Buzurg
64. Khap Pataua
65. Khap Punak Buzurg
66. Khor
67. Kishunpali
68. Kumhti
69. Lachhuman chak
70. Lenja
71. Loharpura
72. Lokaichhapra
73. Mahpalwa
74. Mahuja
75. Majhaulia
76. Marera
77. Mathia
78. Mathia Punak Buzurg
79. Misraulia
80. Munjwania
81. Munra
82. Mura Khap
83. Murakaramwar
84. Narauli
85. Narayanpur
86. Nepura
87. Netwar
88. Oini
89. Parasia
90. Parmanandpur
91. Pataua Buzurg
92. Paterha
93. Patkhauli
94. Pihuli
95. Piprahia
96. Punak Buzurg
97. Rahtawa
98. Ram Punak
99. Ramnagar Kakaria Dih
100. Rampur
101. Rampur
102. Rampurudho
103. Repura
104. Sahjaniya
105. Saraharwa
106. Sarea
107. Sarna
108. Sham Bodi
109. Sobhan Chak
110. Sonbarsa
111. Tanrwa
112. Tariwan
113. Tariwani
114. Tiar
115. Ukrenri

== Daraundha ==
1. Abhui
2. Bagaura
3. Bahgra
4. Baidapur
5. Baldih
6. Baluhi
7. Bangali Bharauli
8. Bela
9. Beldari tola
10. Bhadia
11. Bhikhaban
12. Bhusi
13. Birti tola
14. Bishunpura
15. Chakri
16. Chherahi
17. Chintamanpur
18. Dahkani
19. Daunchhapra
20. Dhebar
21. Dibi
22. Dipni
23. Dumri
24. Duraundha
25. Fatehpur
26. Gobindapur
27. Harsa toli
28. Harsar
29. Hathopur
30. Inda
31. Jagdishpur
32. Jalalpur
33. Jhajhawa
34. Kamsara
35. Karsaut
36. Katwar
37. Khamhoura
38. Kharsara
39. Kolhua
40. Korari Kalan
41. Korari Khurd
42. Koror
43. Kothuasaranpur
44. Machhauta
45. Machhauti
46. Madari Chak
47. Mahachawar
48. Manchha
49. Marsara
50. Mathia
51. Mathia
52. Milki Madhwapur
53. Mirachak
54. Mundaram Chhapra
55. Nanda tola
56. Pachhwari Harsar
57. Pakwalia
58. Panrepur
59. Pasiwarh
60. Pawat
61. Phalpura
62. Pipra
63. Pirarthu Kalan
64. Pirarthu Khurd
65. Raini
66. Rajapur
67. Ramgarha
68. Ramsapur
69. Rangrauli
70. Ranibari
71. Rasulpur
72. Rukundipur
73. Sadhpur
74. Sahdauli
75. Satjora
76. Sherpur
77. Sirsaon
78. Siwan Bigrah
79. Talkhiro
80. Terha
81. Ujaen
82. Usti

== Goriakothi ==
1. Ageyan
2. Bahadurpur
3. Bahopur
4. Barari
5. Bardaha
6. Barhoga Gangaram
7. Barhoga Jaddu
8. Barhoga Parsotim
9. Bazidpur
10. Bhalui
11. Bhithi
12. Bindwal
13. Birti tola
14. Chainpur
15. Chanauli
16. Chanchopali
17. Chandpur
18. Chhitauli Kalan
19. Chhitauli Khurd
20. Chithai
21. Dagri Mathia
22. Dichhitpur
23. Dudhra
24. Dumra
25. Gobindapur
26. Gohuan
27. Gopalpur
28. Gopalpur
29. Gorea Kothi
30. Goria Kothi
31. Hariharpur Kalan
32. Hariharpur Khurd
33. Harpur
34. Hetimpur
35. Heyatpur
36. Jagarnathpur
37. Jagdishpur
38. Jagdishpur
39. Jalalpur
40. Jamo
41. Jangal belas
42. Kaleanpur
43. Karanpura
44. Karpalia
45. Khagni
46. Khulasa
47. Laka tola
48. Laka tola
49. Lala Hata
50. Lilaru Aurangabad
51. Lilaru Habib
52. Mahammadpur
53. Mahammadpur
54. Majhaulia
55. Mathia
56. Meghwar
57. Mirzapur
58. Mustafabad
59. Nautan
60. Pachpakaria Padumpatti
61. Pachpakaria Tulsi
62. Pachpatia
63. Pahlejpur
64. Pipra
65. Purandarpur
66. Rampur
67. Sadipur
68. Saidpura
69. Sani Basantpur
70. Sarari
71. Sarea
72. Sathwar
73. Satwar
74. Sauna
75. Shekhpura
76. Sherpur
77. Shiurajpur
78. Sisai
79. Sultanpur Kalan
80. Sultanpur Khurd
81. Tola Jalalpur

== Guthani ==
1. Arazi Ekbari
2. Arazi Ekwari
3. Arazi Inglish
4. Arazi Inglish
5. Bahelia
6. Bahelia
7. Bakulari
8. Balua
9. Bangra
10. Barpalia
11. Basuhari
12. Bauri
13. Belaur
14. Belauri
15. Bhagwanpur
16. Bhalua
17. Bhalui
18. Bharauli
19. Bhathahi
20. Bhulauli
21. Bihari Buzurg
22. Bihari Khurd
23. Bishunpura
24. Biswar
25. Chain Chhapra
26. Chakia
27. Chaumukha Kalan
28. Chaumukha Khurd
29. Chilamarwa
30. Chiraua
31. Chit Bisraon
32. Chitakhal
33. Chorbharia
34. Damodra
35. Danraila
36. Darzi Chak
37. Deuria
38. Dhanauti
39. Dharampur
40. Dhaula
41. Ekwari
42. Gareria
43. Geyaspur
44. Goharua
45. Gothini
46. Harpur
47. Jamuaon
48. Jataur
49. Jhajhaur
50. Kaleyani
51. Karamdaha
52. Kareji
53. Kelharua
54. Khap Jataur
55. Khap Lebhri
56. Khap Misraulia
57. Kharaunti
58. Kharkharia
59. Khilwa
60. Khirauli
61. Kishunpura
62. Kunresar
63. Kurmauli
64. Kurmha
65. Lachhmipur
66. Mairitanr
67. Mairitanr Diara
68. Majhawalia
69. Malchaur
70. Mamaur
71. Mian Gondi
72. Misir Chhapara
73. Misrauli
74. Nainijor
75. Odikhor
76. Olia
77. Pachnerua
78. Pachnerui
79. Pachnerui
80. Panre Gondi
81. Panrepar
82. Parari
83. Pataua Khurd
84. Pataua Lakhraj
85. Piparpanti
86. Rewasi
87. Rimafat Chhapra
88. Samatanr
89. Sarea
90. Sarphora
91. Selaur
92. Sirkarpur
93. Sohagra
94. Sohrai
95. Sonahula
96. Surwar Gondi
97. Tali Buzurg
98. Tali Khurd
99. Talidal Chand
100. Tanrwa Khurd
101. Tanrwa Tiwari
102. Tarka
103. Tekania
104. Tendua
105. Thegwalia

== Hasanpura ==
1. Aranda
2. Arjal
3. Banri Sarai
4. Basantnagar
5. Bhekhpurwa
6. Bishambharpur
7. Chak Damri
8. Chakiya
9. Chandparsa
10. Deipur
11. Dhanauti
12. Dibi
13. Gay Ghat
14. Hamid Chak
15. Harpur
16. Harpur Kotwa
17. Hasanpura
18. Jalalpur
19. Jalalpur
20. Jalalpur
21. Jhaua
22. Kabilpura
23. Kabiruddin Chak
24. Karmansi
25. Khajepur Kalan
26. Khajepur Khurd
27. Kohrauta
28. Laheji
29. Laram Chak
30. Madhwapur
31. Madhwapur
32. Mahual
33. Malahidih
34. Mandrapali
35. Mandrauli
36. Mathia Bachangir
37. Merahi
38. Mitwar
39. Mohmudpur
40. Nizampur
41. Pakari
42. Parari
43. Parauli
44. Parsa Harnatanr
45. Pasiwarh
46. Phalpura
47. Piaur
48. Pipra
49. Puraina
50. Rafipur
51. Rajanpura
52. Rasulpur
53. Rukni Urf Manchha Khap
54. Sahuli
55. Semri
56. Shahabaz Chak
57. Shekhpura
58. Shekhpurwa
59. Suraiya
60. Tanrila
61. Tanrwa
62. Telkathu
63. Ujraha
64. Usri Buzurg
65. Usri Khurd

== Hussainganj ==
1. Baghauni
2. Bali
3. Bararam
4. Bindwal
5. Chak Hazi
6. Chanp
7. Chhapiya Buzurg
8. Chhapiya Khurd
9. Chhata
10. Darweshpur
11. Dhankhar
12. Faridpur
13. Fazilpur
14. Gopalpur
15. Gosopali
16. Habibnagar
17. Harihans
18. Hasanpurwa
19. Hathaura
20. Hathauri
21. Jurkan
22. Karhanu
23. Khajrauni
24. Khanpur Khairanti
25. Kharsara
26. khodai Bari
27. Machakna
28. Mahpur
29. Mahual
30. Markan
31. Nathpur
32. Nawalpur
33. Paighambarpur
34. Pakaulia
35. Partappur
36. Rashid Chak
37. Rasulpur
38. Renua
39. Salonepur
40. Sarea
41. Shahbazpur
42. Sidhaul
43. Singarpatti
44. Sonahula
45. Surapur
46. Tetaria
47. Tikri

== Lakri Nabiganj ==
1. Adharpur
2. Babnauli
3. Bahgra
4. Bajarmara
5. Bala
6. Baldiha
7. Barwa Dumri
8. Basauli
9. Bazidpur
10. Bhada Khurd
11. Bhopatpur Bharthia
12. Dabchhu
13. Dumra
14. Gopalpur
15. Imadpur
16. Indauli
17. Jagatpur
18. Jalalpur
19. Kapripur
20. Khawaspur
21. Khusal Dumri
22. Kishunpura
23. Lakhanaura
24. Lakri
25. Madarpur
26. Marachi
27. Munsepur
28. Musahari
29. Narharpur
30. Pakri
31. Parauli
32. Saidpur
33. Sikatia
34. Siktia Khap
35. Talimapur
36. Talimapur
37. Talimapur Birt
38. Taya Dumri
39. Telia
40. Ujjaina

== Maharajganj ==
1. Aphrad
2. Bagauchha
3. Bagauchha Khurd
4. Bajrahia
5. Balau
6. Balia
7. Baliapatti
8. Bangra
9. Bangra
10. Barahia tola
11. Bhajua
12. Bishunpur Mahuari
13. Bishunpura
14. Chak Mahmuda
15. Chandpur
16. Chhotka Teghra
17. Dalpatpur
18. Dareji
19. Deuriya
20. Dhanchhuha
21. Dhanpura
22. Dhobwalia
23. Gaur
24. Gaur
25. Gaur Kathak
26. Gaur Rauza
27. Gohpur
28. Hahwa
29. Hajipurwa
30. Harkeshpur
31. Higauli
32. Itahari
33. Jagdishpur
34. Jagdishpur
35. Jalalpur
36. Jigrawn
37. Kalyanpur
38. Kas Deura
39. Khamhauri
40. Khapura Khanpur
41. Kheduchhapra
42. Lerua
43. Madhopur
44. Madhopur
45. Maharajganj (NP)
46. Manpur
47. Mardanpur
48. Misraulia
49. Nautan
50. Pakaulia
51. Paterha
52. Phalpura
53. Pipra Kalan
54. Pipra Khurd
55. Pokhra
56. Rahia
57. Ratanpura
58. Risaura
59. Sarangpur
60. Sarea
61. Shahganj
62. Shahpur
63. Shakra
64. Shiude
65. Sikandarpur
66. Siktia
67. Sonbarsa
68. Surbir
69. Takipur
70. Teghra
71. Teotha
72. Ushuri

== Mairwa ==
1. Arazi Inglish
2. Atwa
3. Babhnauli
4. Bhalua
5. Baraso
6. Bargaon
7. Barka Manjha
8. Bedauli
9. Belaspur
10. Bhopatpura
11. Bishunpura
12. Chakri
13. Chakia
14. Chitmath
15. Chup Chupwa
16. Dhamaur
17. Dharahra
18. Dharni Chhapra
19. Dhusa
20. Domdih
21. Dumar Chhapra
22. English
23. Ghansham Mathia
24. Gopal Chak
25. Harnathpur
26. Kabirpur
27. Kabita
28. Kaithaulia
29. Karjania
30. Khap Siswa
31. Kolhuwa Dargah
32. Kuldipa
33. Labhri
34. Lachhimipur
35. Lashkari Chhapra
36. Mairwa (NP)
37. Mathia
38. Muriyari
39. Narahiya
40. Nawada
41. Parasia
42. Parasia Khurd
43. Patkhauli
44. Pharchhua
45. Pharchhuhi
46. Pipra
47. Semra
48. Seni Chhapra
49. Sewtapur
50. Sirsia
51. Siswa Buzurg
52. Siswa Khurd
53. Sitalpura
54. Sumeri Chhapra
55. Surad Sahi
56. Ugarsen Chhapra

== Nautan ==
1. Agaunta
2. Balua
3. Balwa
4. Bara Shikuara
5. Baraipatti
6. Basdewa
7. Bishambharpur
8. Bishunpura
9. Dewan Chak
10. Galimapur
11. Gamhirpur
12. Gandharpa
13. Gobardhana
14. Harpur
15. Hathaunji
16. Jagdishpur
17. Khalwa
18. Khap Bankat
19. Khap Misrauli
20. Kilpur
21. Kilpur
22. Kurmauta
23. Marachhi
24. Mathia
25. Misir Chak
26. Misrauli khas
27. Murarpatti
28. Narayanpur
29. Narayanpur
30. Narkatia
31. Nautan
32. Partappur
33. Pipra
34. Qadir Chak
35. Rahimpur
36. Ramgarh
37. Rampur
38. Sagra
39. Semaria
40. Semra Buzurg
41. Semra Khurd
42. Shahpur
43. Shahpur Misrauli
44. Shikuara
45. Siswa
46. Tali
47. Tirmanpur

== Pachrukhi ==
1. Akopur
2. Alapur
3. Atarsua
4. Babhnauli
5. Baisakhi
6. Bangra Sirikant
7. Banjariya
8. Barahani
9. Barkagaon
10. Bartawalia
11. Baryarpur
12. Benusar Buzurg
13. Bharathpura
14. Bhatwalia
15. Bhatwalia
16. Bijehata
17. Budhu Chhapra
18. Chak Pasram
19. Chandpur
20. Chaumukha
21. Daroga Hata
22. Dihiya
23. Dinapatti
24. Gamharia
25. Garibganj
26. Gharthaulia
27. Ghorgahiya
28. Gopalpur
29. Gopipatti
30. Gosain Chhapra
31. Gotharo
32. Hakkam
33. Hakma
34. Hamdipur
35. Hardia
36. Hata
37. Itwa
38. Jasauli Kharag
39. Jasauli Pakauli
40. Jhunapur
41. Kaithi
42. Kaleanpur
43. Kodai
44. Korakhap
45. Korar
46. Madhwapur
47. Mahpur
48. Mahuari
49. Majhaulia
50. Makhnupur
51. Malupur
52. Matuk Chhapra
53. Mithanpura
54. Mohammadpur
55. Nainpura
56. Narayanpur
57. Narhat
58. Nathanpura
59. Nauranga
60. Nizampur
61. Nuruddinpur
62. Pachrukhi
63. Pagar Kothi
64. Pakhrera
65. Pakri Bangali
66. Papaur
67. Pengwara
68. Pipra
69. Rampur
70. Rasulpur
71. Saddikpur
72. Sahlaur
73. Samopur
74. Saraia
75. Sarauti
76. Siswa
77. Sonapipar
78. Sota
79. Supauli
80. Surwala
81. Tarwara
82. Ukhai purbaripatti
83. Ukhaipachhiaripatti
84. Walipur

== Raghunathpur ==
1. Abhimanwan
2. Adampur
3. Aima Sukhatpali
4. Amhara
5. Amwari
6. Anwar
7. Bahelia
8. Bangra
9. Bankat Main Chak
10. Baraipur
11. Baruna
12. Basantpur
13. Basantpur
14. Basantpur Diara
15. Basarh
16. Belaura Dih
17. Belwar
18. Bhagwanpur
19. Bhanti
20. Bharthipatti
21. Bhulli Chakri
22. Bishundas Chak
23. Bishunpura
24. Bishunpura
25. Chak Daula
26. Chak Makhdum Alam
27. Chakia
28. Chakra
29. Chakri
30. Chaksultanpur
31. Chauri Kalan
32. Chhitni Dumri
33. Daulatpur
34. Deopur
35. Dhorhaha
36. Diara Bhaw Singh
37. Dighwaliya
38. Dilawarpur
39. Domanpura
40. Edilpur
41. Elahi Chak
42. Firozpur
43. Gabhirar
44. Gobhirar Diara
45. Gonaria
46. Gopalpur
47. Haibatpur
48. Harnathpur
49. Harpalpur
50. Harpur
51. Harpur Diara
52. Hasopur
53. Jaijori
54. Jawanpura
55. Jorapur
56. Kajrasan
57. Kakuliyat
58. Kandhauli
59. Kanhradhari Haltamah
60. Kanrsar
61. Kaunsar Diara
62. Kausar
63. Khap Dhanauti
64. Khujwa
65. Konhara Dhari Nizamat Diara
66. Konhradhari Nizamat
67. Kusahra
68. Lachhipur
69. Lachhuman Dumari
70. Lagusa
71. Lahladpur
72. Lohbara
73. Mahazi Diara Kakarghatta
74. Mahazi Gondauli
75. Mahendar Buzurg
76. Mahrauli
77. Marwatia
78. Mauzachakki Diara Sultanpur
79. Mianchandi
80. Miran Chak
81. Mirpur
82. Mirzapur
83. Mirzapur
84. Mirzapur
85. Majilsha
86. Moti Chak
87. Nadiaon
88. Narhan
89. Narhan Diara
90. Navadih
91. Nawada
92. Nawada Diara
93. Newari
94. Nigja
95. Nikhti Kalan
96. Nikhti Khurd
97. Nima Dih
98. Odakpur
99. Pachbarwa
100. Padartha
101. Panjwar
102. Parahia
103. Parasram Dumri
104. Parasrampur
105. Patiaon
106. Patiaon Gopi
107. Phulwaria
108. Pipra
109. Raghunath Lahar
110. Raghunathpur
111. Raiti Chandi
112. Rajpur
113. Rampur Lattha
114. Sadhpur
115. Sahimpur
116. Saichani
117. Saidpur
118. Salempur
119. Santhi
120. Saran Dumri
121. Shahpur
122. Sitalpur
123. Sonbarsa
124. Sultanpur
125. Surajbalia
126. Tallahar
127. Tanri
128. Ungo

== Siswan ==
1. Alakh Diyara
2. Ansar
3. Arjanipur
4. Baghauna
5. Baishistnagar
6. Bakhri
7. Bangra
8. Bangra
9. Barauna
10. Bawan Dih
11. Bhadaur
12. Bhagar
13. Bhagwanpur
14. Bhaisaurha
15. Bharwalia
16. Bhikhpur
17. Bhikhpur Bhagwanpur
18. Birti
19. Birti Lakheraj
20. Chainpur Mobarakpur
21. Chak Haibat
22. Chandpur
23. Chandpur
24. Chatar
25. Chatea
26. Chatea Diara
27. Chaturbhujpur
28. Chhitauli
29. Chungulpura
30. Dhorhahi
31. Gangapur
32. Gayaspur
33. Gayaspur Diyara
34. Ghurghat
35. Gobindpur
36. Gopalpur
37. Gudi Dih
38. Haibatpur
39. Harihar Chhapra
40. Husena
41. Ijra
42. Ismail Chak
43. Jagdishpur
44. Jhotpur
45. Kachnar
46. Kasarh
47. Kathtal
48. Kauli Chhapra
49. Kishunwari
50. Kolhua
51. Madhopur
52. Madhwapur
53. Mahanagar
54. Majharia
55. Makhnupur
56. Manara
57. Mathia
58. Menhdar
59. Misroulia
60. Morwan
61. Mura Parsotim
62. Nagai
63. Nagai
64. Nagai Khas
65. Nanda Mura
66. Nawada
67. Nawada
68. Nawalpur
69. Naya Gaon
70. Nirmal Nagai
71. Noniapatti
72. Pachamuwa
73. Pachbhinda
74. Parari
75. Pipra
76. Ramgarh
77. Rampur
78. Rampur
79. Sainpur
80. Sainpur Diara
81. Sarahra
82. Saraut
83. Siswa Khurd
84. Siswan
85. Siswan Kalan
86. Sonbarsa
87. Suahi
88. Tarenawa
89. Tilauta
90. Ubdhi

== Siwan ==
1. Adli
2. Adlichak
3. Aghaila
4. Akhainiyam
5. Amlori
6. Baghra
7. Balchandhata
8. Baletha
9. Bansopali
10. Barhan
11. Barhea
12. Batrauli
13. Benusar
14. Bhada Kalan
15. Bhada Khurd
16. Bhadaura
17. Bhanta Pokhar
18. Bharthui
19. Bhatwalia
20. Bishambharpur
21. Bishunpur
22. Bishunpurwa
23. Chakra
24. Chanaur
25. Chhotpur
26. Dewapali
27. Dhanauti
28. Dharam Makariar
29. Gopalpur
30. Hari Balmha
31. Hasanpurwa
32. Hasanpurwa
33. Jafra
34. Jamsikri
35. Jiaen
36. Kaira Tal
37. Kalinjra
38. Karanpura
39. Kararua
40. Khagaura
41. Khalispur
42. Khudra
43. Lakri Makariar
44. Lohsi Kalan
45. Lohsi Khurd
46. Mahuari
47. Majahida(Majahidpur)
48. Majhaulia
49. Majhwa
50. Makariar
51. Mardapur
52. Mirapur
53. Mohammadpur
54. Mohiuddinpur
55. Molnapur
56. Mura
57. Nathuchhap
58. Naupali
59. Orma Makund
60. Pachaura
61. Pachlakhi
62. Paighambarpur
63. Pakri Makariar or Badli
64. Pararia
65. Phulwaria
66. Pithauri
67. Puraina
68. Ramapali
69. Rampur
70. Salempur
71. Sarabe
72. Sarsa
73. Sarsar
74. Shampur
75. Siari
76. Sirishtapur
77. Siwan
78. Siwan (Nagar Parishad)
79. Sujaon
80. Tahira
81. Tanrwa
82. Thakur Pachlakhi

== Ziradei ==
1. Akolhi
2. Baikunthpur
3. Balaipur
4. Bangra
5. Banthu Salona
6. Banthu Sriram
7. Bardahan
8. Barheya
9. Barhulia
10. Baroha
11. Belwasa
12. Berhea
13. Bhaisakhal
14. Bhalua Makund
15. Bhaluwahi
16. Bharauli
17. Bharthua
18. Bharthui
19. Bhatkan khem
20. Bhikpur
21. Bijaipur
22. Bikaur
23. Bishunpura
24. Chandauli Gangauli
25. Chandpali
26. Chhaprapal
27. Chhitanpur
28. Chhotka Manjha
29. Dharampur
30. Fajulhi
31. Gangauli
32. Garar
33. Garar
34. Gaziapur Bedaulia
35. Gobrahi
36. Gonthi
37. Hardopatti
38. Harpur
39. Harpur Madanpur
40. Hasanpurwa
41. Hasua
42. Hir Makriar
43. Jamapur
44. Jiradei
45. Kakarghatti
46. Khargi Rampur
47. Kishunpur Misrauli
48. Mahamudpur
49. Mahmudpur
50. Majhwalia
51. Makundpur
52. Manian
53. Misrauli Lakheraj
54. Miyan Ke Bhathkan
55. Muian
56. Munra
57. Nandpali
58. Narayanpur
59. Narindpur
60. Pakaulia
61. Parasurampur
62. Pathardei
63. Phulwaria
64. Piprahia
65. Pokhrera
66. Raichanda
67. Repura
68. Ruia
69. Sajna
70. Salrapur
71. Sanjalpur
72. Santhu
73. Shakra
74. Shankarpur
75. Sikia
76. Singahi
77. Sisahani
78. Surujpura
79. Surwal
80. Thepaha Raja Ram
81. Titara
