= Faridpur =

Faridpur may refer to:

== Bangladesh ==
- Faridpur, Bangladesh, a city and district headquarter in Faridpur District
- Faridpur District, a district in Dhaka Division
  - Faridpur Sadar Upazila, a subdistrict of Faridpur District, containing Faridpur City
- Faridpur Division, a proposed administrative division
- Faridpur Upazila, Pabna District, Rajshahi Division

== India ==
- Faridpur (Assembly constituency), Uttar Pradesh Legislative Assembly
- Faridpur Village, a village in Siwan district of Bihar state
- Faridpur, Uttar Pradesh, a town in Uttar Pradesh
- Faridpur Durgapur, a community development block in Paschim Bardhaman district of West Bengal
- Faridpur, Sultanpur Lodhi, a village in Kapurthala district of Punjab
- Faridpur, Harchandpur, a village in Raebareli district of Uttar Pradesh
- Faridpur Village, a village in Daniyawan, Salarpur, district of Bihar state

== Pakistan ==
- Faridpur, Khanewal, Punjab Province
- Faridpur, Multan, Punjab Province
- Faridpur, Narowal, Punjab Province

== See also ==
- Faridabad (disambiguation)
- Fardpur, a village in Uttar Pradesh, India
- Faridnagar, a town in Uttar Pradesh, India
