= Dibi, Siwan =

Village in Siwan district

Dibi डीबी
- Village
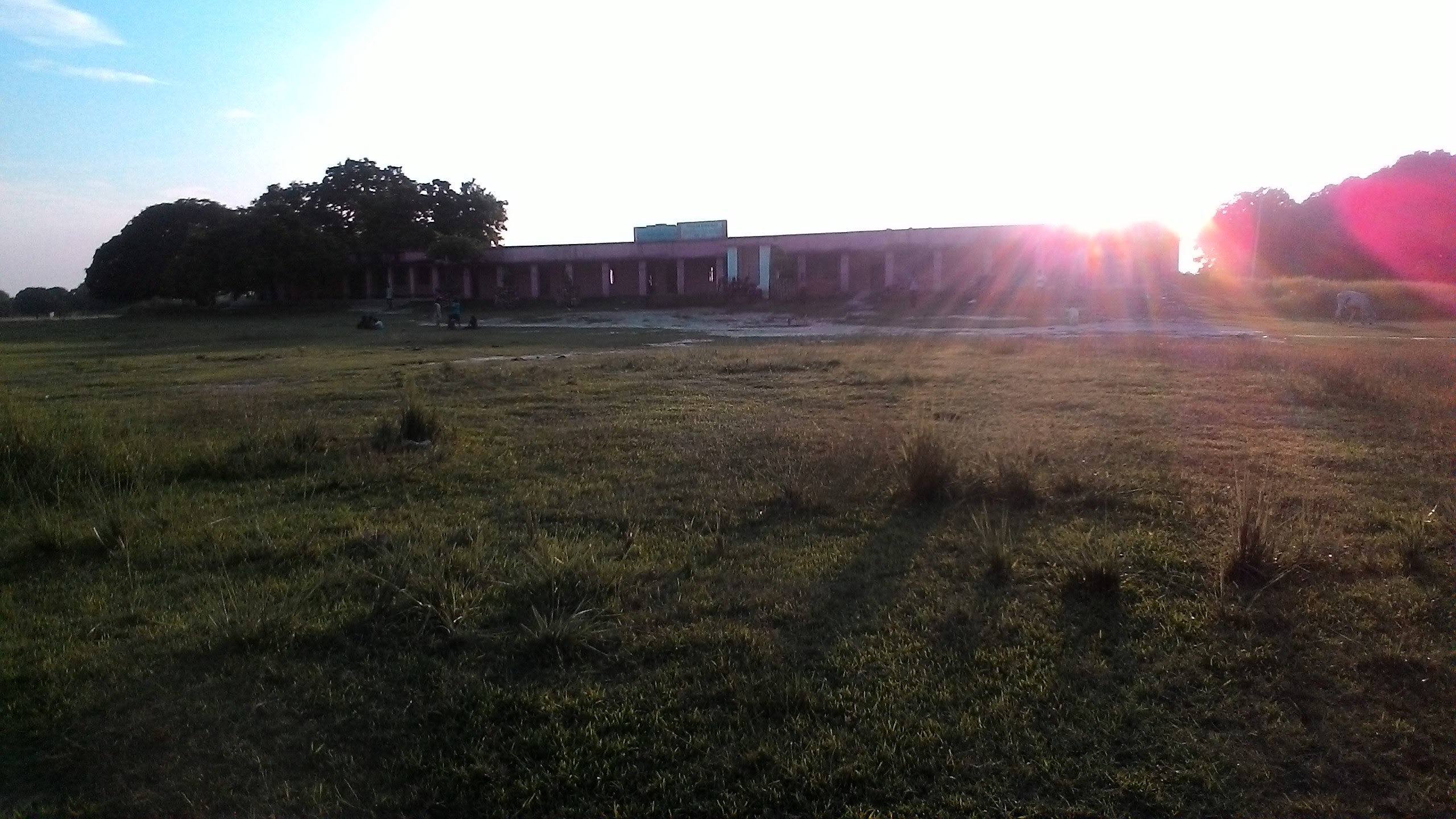
- B D P Y High School, Dibi, Pakari.
- Dibi (#583) in Hasanpura block map
- Location in Bihar Dibi (India)
- Coordinates: 26.0620718°N 84.4046211°E
- Country: India
- State: Bihar
- District: Siwan district
- Block: Hasanpura

Government
  - Type: Local Government
  - Body: Panchayati Raj
  - Panchayat: Pakari
  - Mukhiya: Late Prabhunath Yadav
  - Lok Sabha constituency: Siwan
  - Vidhan Sabha constituency: Daraunda

Area
  - Total: 69 km^{2} (27 sq mi)
- Elevation: 61.9 m (203 ft)

Population (2,011 Census)
  - Total: 2,164
  - Density: 31/km^{2} (81/sq mi)

Languages
  - Official: Hindi & English
  - Regional: Bhojpuri
- Time zone: UTC+5:30 (IST)
- PIN: 841240
- ISO 3166 code: IN-BR
- Vehicle registration: BR29
- Website: siwan.nic.in

Dibi is a village located in the Hasanpura block of Siwan district in Bihar, India. It is under the administrative control of Pakari gram panchayat and neighbor of Merahi village.

== Geography ==
Dibi covers a total area of approximately 147.35 hectares. Agriculture is the primary occupation due to rich alluvial soil.

== Administration ==
Dibi functions under the Panchayati raj system. The village is governed by a gram panchayat and administrated by an elected Mukhiya.

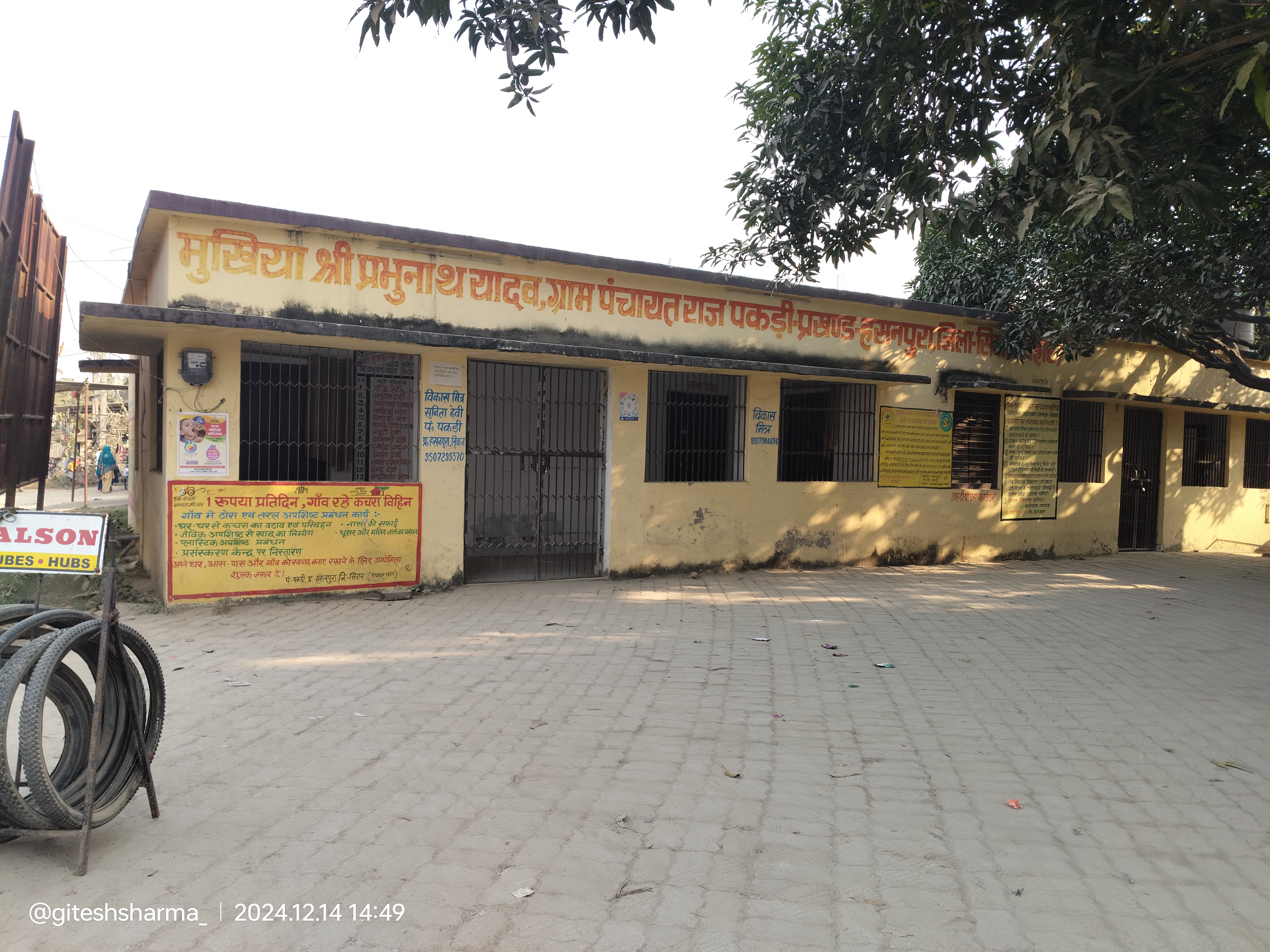
Pakari Panchayat Bhavan, Siwan, Bihar.

== Demographics ==
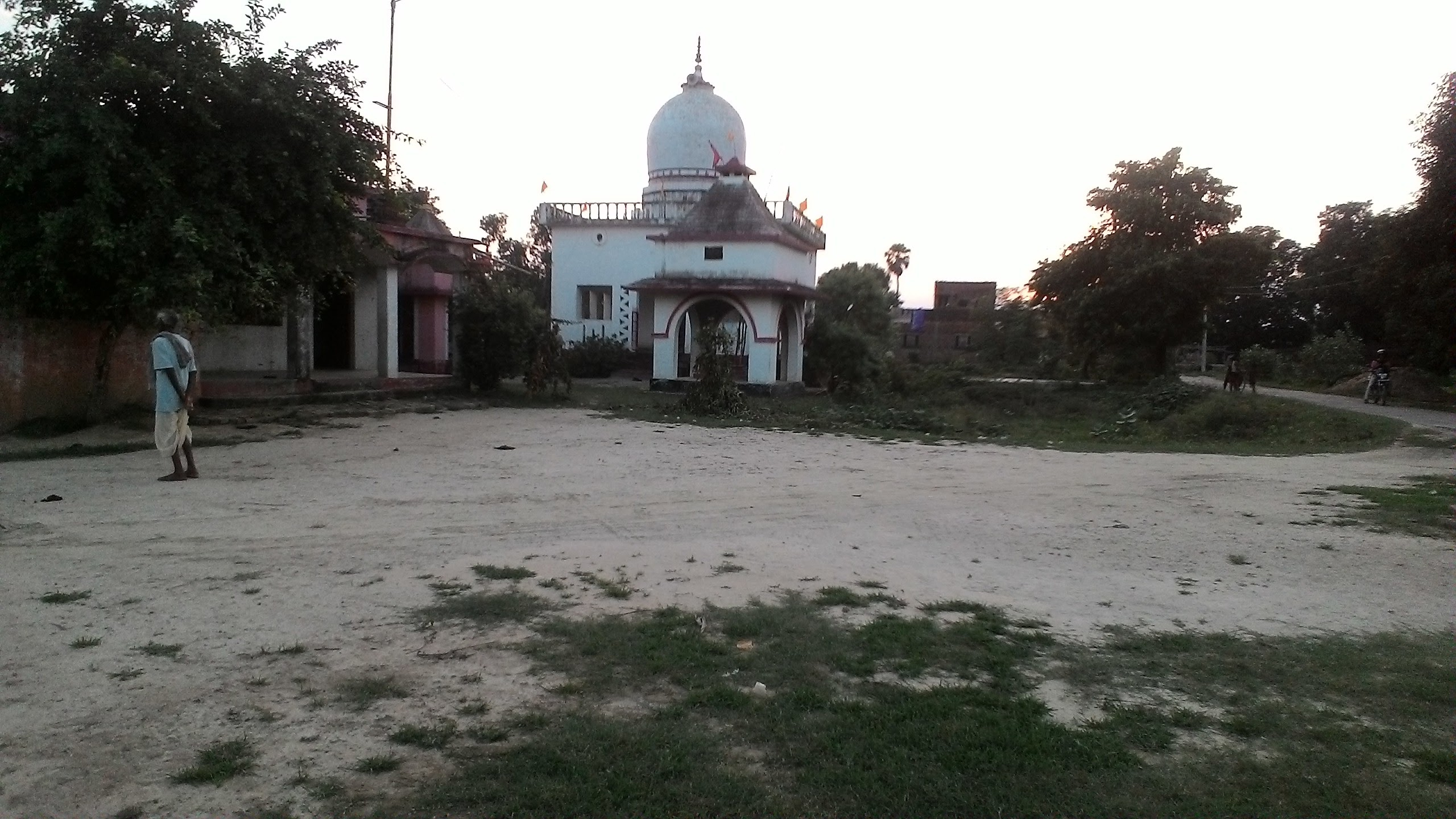
Baba Dibeswarnath Shiv Mandir, Dibi, Siwan, Bihar.

As per the 2011 Census of India, Dibi has a total population of 2,164 living in 156 households. There are 998 males and 1166 females.

== See also ==
- Merahi
- Pakari Gram Panchayat
- List of villages in Siwan district
- Siwan subdivision
- Administration in Bihar
- Daraunda Assembly constituency
- Siwan Lok Sabha constituency
