= Sadikpur =

Sadikpur or Sadiqpur may refer to:

== Places ==
- Sadikpur, Murshidabad, a village in Jangipur subdivision of West Bengal, India
- Sadikpur, Siwan, a village in Siwan District of Bihar, India
- Sabikpur, Lakhisarai, a village in Lakhisarai district of Bihar state India
- Sadiqpur, a village in Shahkot in Jalandhar district of Punjab State, India

== Railway ==
- Sadiqpur railway station, located in Pakistan
