= Madhopur =

Madhopur may refer to several places:

- Madhopur, Rautahat, a village in Nepal
- Madhopur, Jalandhar, a village in India
- Madhopur, Punjab, a town in India
- Madhopur, Siwan, a village in India

== See also ==
- Madhupur (disambiguation)
