= Laheji, Bihar =

Village in Siwan district, Bihar, India

Laheji लहेजी Lahejee
- Gram Panchayat
- Laheji (#608) in Hasanpura block map
- Location in Bihar
- Coordinates: 26.094°N 84.380°E
- Country: India
- State: Bihar
- District: Siwan district
- Block: Hasanpura

Government
  - Type: Local Government
  - Body: Panchayati Raj
  - Panchayat: Laheji
  - Lok Sabha constituency: Siwan
  - Assembly seat: Daraunda

Area
  - Total: 5.6 km^{2} (2.2 sq mi)

Population (2,011 Census)
  - Total: 7,771
  - Density: 1,400/km^{2} (3,600/sq mi)

Languages
  - Official: Hindi & English
  - Regional: Bhojpuri

Demographics
  - Literacy: 54.29%
  - Sex ratio: 1108/1000 (Males: 3686, Females: 4085)
- Time zone: UTC+5:30 (IST)
- PIN: 841233
- ISO 3166 code: IN-BR
- Vehicle registration: BR29
- Website: siwan.bih.nic.in

Laheji or Lahejee is a gram panchayat located in the Hasanpura Block of Siwan district in the Indian state of Bihar, India.

== Geography ==
Laheji covers a total area of approximately 5.6 sq. kilometres. Agriculture is the primary occupation due to rich alluvial soil.

== Administration ==
Laheji functions under the panchayati raj system. The village is governed by a gram panchayat and administrated by an elected Mukhiya.

== Demographics ==
As per the 2011 Census of India, Laheji has a total population of 7,771 living in 1172 households. There are 3,686 males and 4,085 females, resulting in a sex ratio of 1,108 females per 1,000 males.

=== Age distribution ===
Children aged 0–6 years number 1337 including 678 girls, accounting for 17.20% of the population. The child sex ratio is 954.

=== Literacy ===
According to the 2011 Census, the literacy rate in Laheji is 52.9% (4113). The male literacy rate is 77.1%, while the female literacy rate is 22.9% (1779).

== Notable people ==
- Om Prakash Yadav, National Vice-president of Bharatiya Janata Party Kisan Morcha or Ex-MP of Siwan, Bihar.
- Hrishikesh Sulabh, Hindi writer or Poet & awarded Sangeet Natak Akademi Award in 2019.

== See also ==
- Hasanpura
- Merahi
- Pakari, Bihar
- Siwan district
- Panchayati raj (India)
- List of villages in Siwan district
- Siwan subdivision
- Administration in Bihar
