= Merahi =

Village in Siwan, Bihar, India

Merahi मेरही
- Village
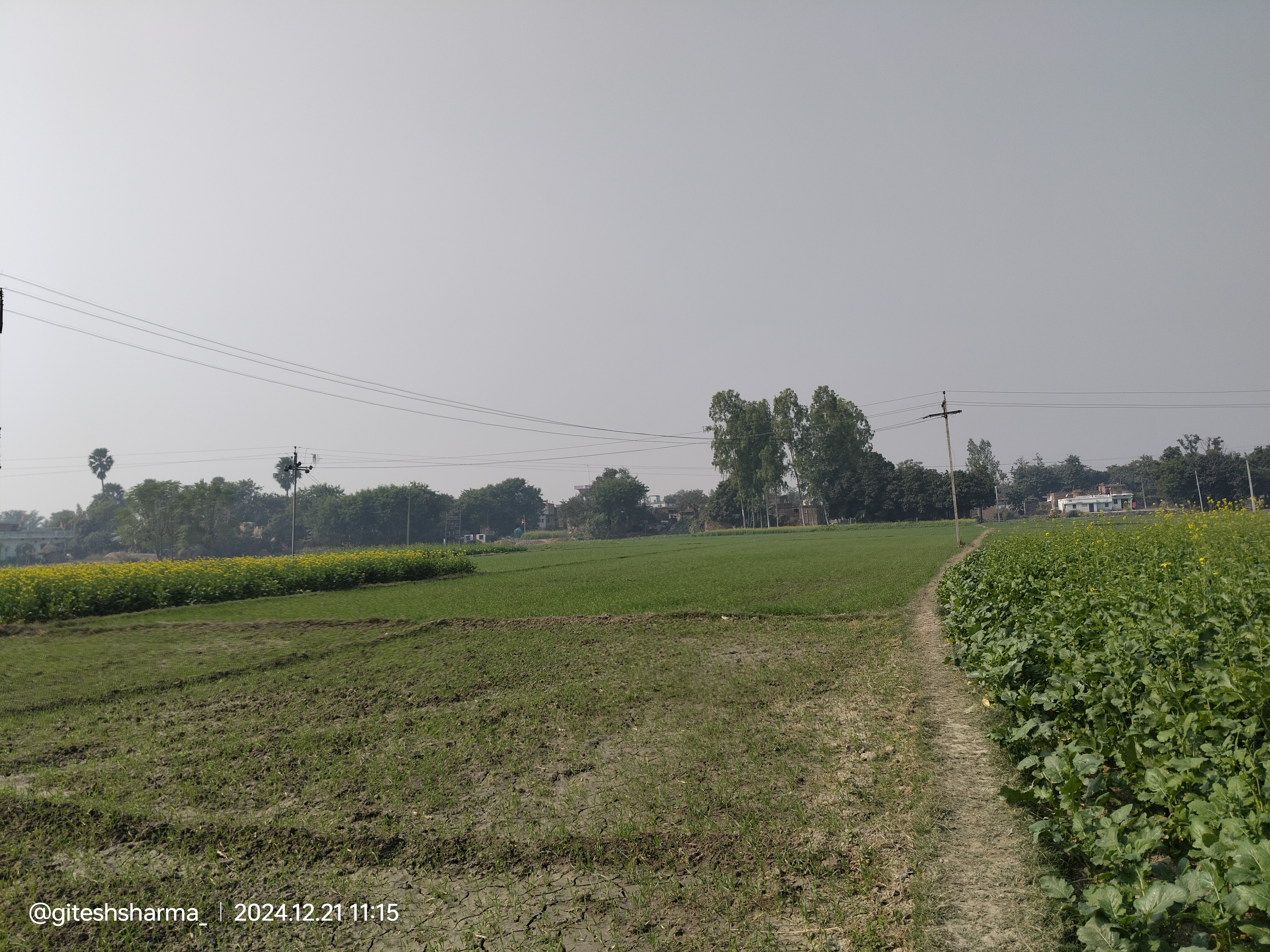
- East Front of Merahi Village
- Merahi (#578) in Hasanpura block map
- Location in Bihar, India Merahi (India)
- Coordinates: 26.422°N 84.241°E
- Country: India
- State: Bihar
- District: Siwan district
- Block: Hasanpura

Government
  - Type: Local Government
  - Body: Panchayati Raj
  - Panchayat: Pakari
  - Mukhiya: Rita Devi
  - Lok Sabha constituency: Siwan
  - Vidhan Sabha constituency: Daraunda

Area
  - Total: 2.58 km^{2} (1.00 sq mi)
- Elevation: 61.9 m (203 ft)

Population (2,011 Census)
  - Total: 1,829
  - Density: 709/km^{2} (1,840/sq mi)

Languages
  - Official: Hindi & English
  - Regional: Bhojpuri

Demographics
  - Literacy: 63%
  - Sex ratio: 1233 (Males: 819 - 44.78%, Females: 1010 - 55.22%)
- Time zone: UTC+5:30 (IST)
- PIN: 841240
- ISO 3166 code: IN-BR
- Vehicle registration: BR29
- Website: merahi-village.github.io

Merahi is a village located in the Hasanpura block of Siwan district in Bihar, India. It falls under the Pakari gram panchayat and is approximately 7 km from the sub-district headquarters in Hasanpura and about 15 km from the district headquarters in Siwan.

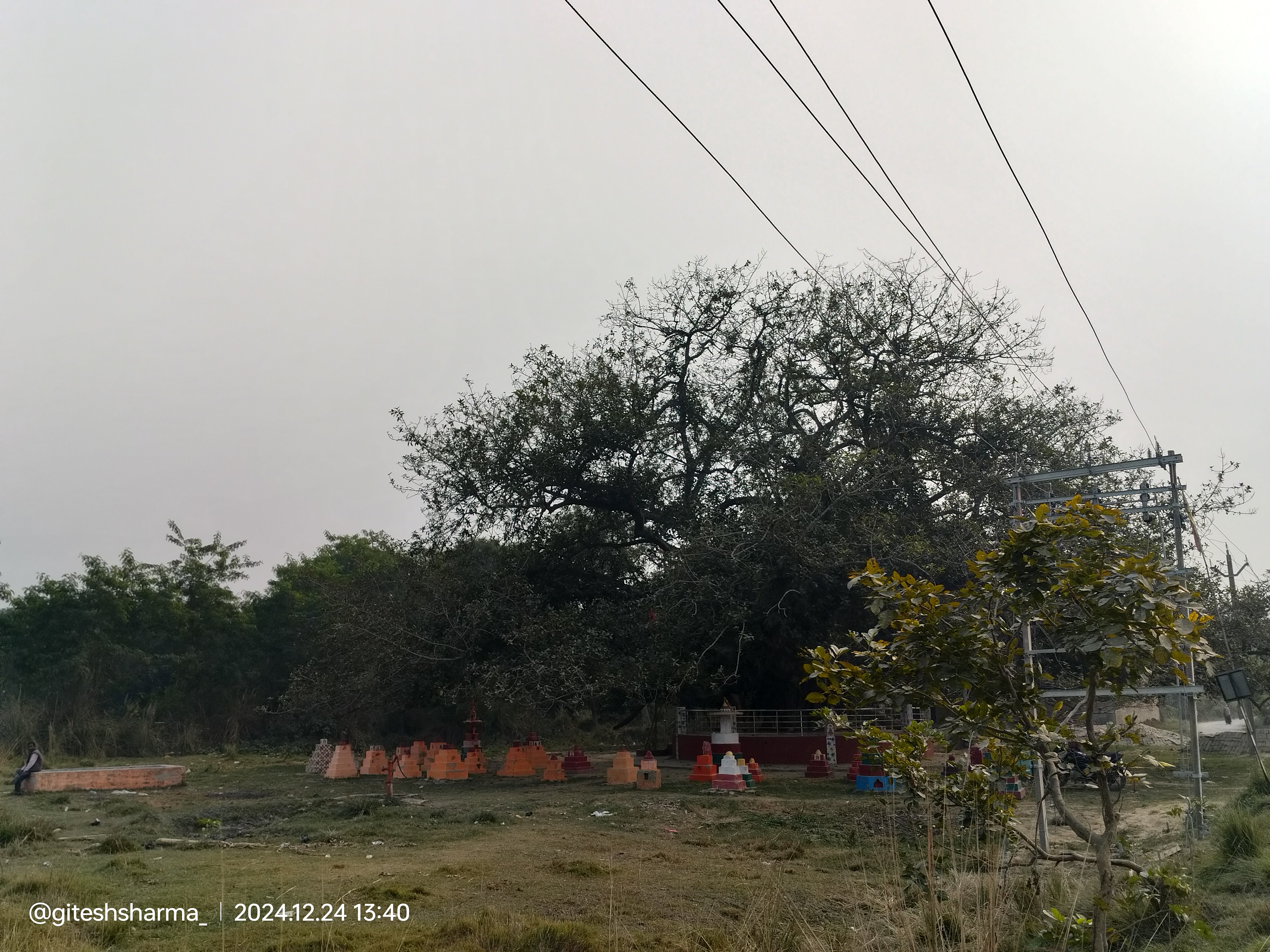
Brahm Baba from West side of Merahi

== Demographics ==
The 2011 Census of India recorded Merahi village in Bihar with a population of 1829, including 819 males and 1010 females, spread across 291 households. The village has a notable literacy rate of 63.04%, with 566 literate males and 587 literate females. The average household size is approximately 6 people.

== Geography ==
According to the government records, the village code of Merahi is 232578. The village has 291 houses. Agriculture is the main profession of this village. The total geographical area of village is 258.8 hectares.

== Administration ==
Merahi Village is geographically located within the Hasanpura subdivision of the Siwan district in the state of Bihar, India.

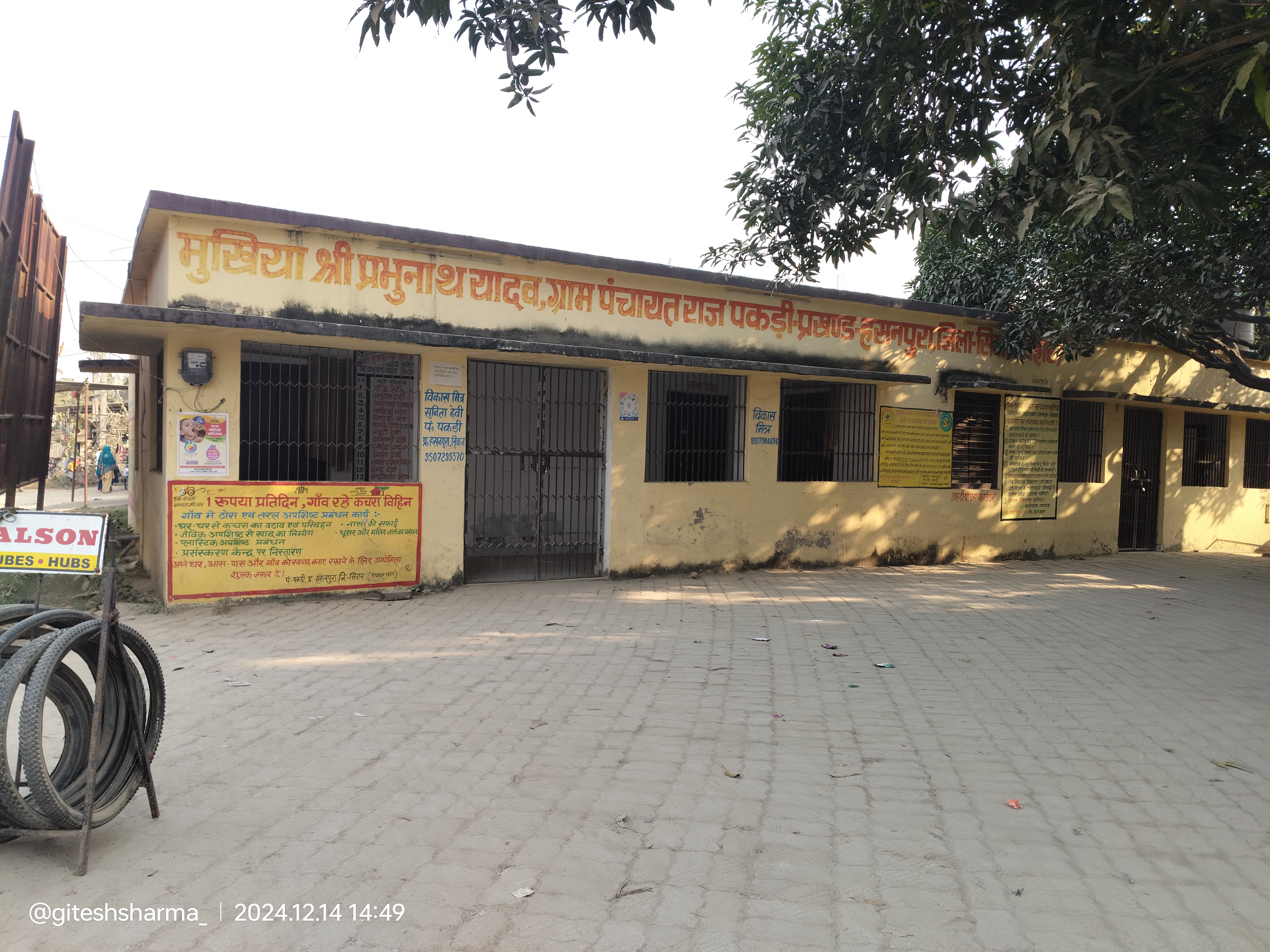
Pakari Panchayat Bhavan, Siwan, Bihar.

The village's administrative affiliation extends to the local self-governance bodies, falling under the Pakari gram panchayat, and the Hasanpura Block Panchayat.

== Education ==
Rajkiya Prathmik Vidhyalaya is also known as Merahi Primary School, established in 1960 and managed by the Education Department, Government of Bihar, is located in a rural area within the Hasanpura Block of Siwan district.

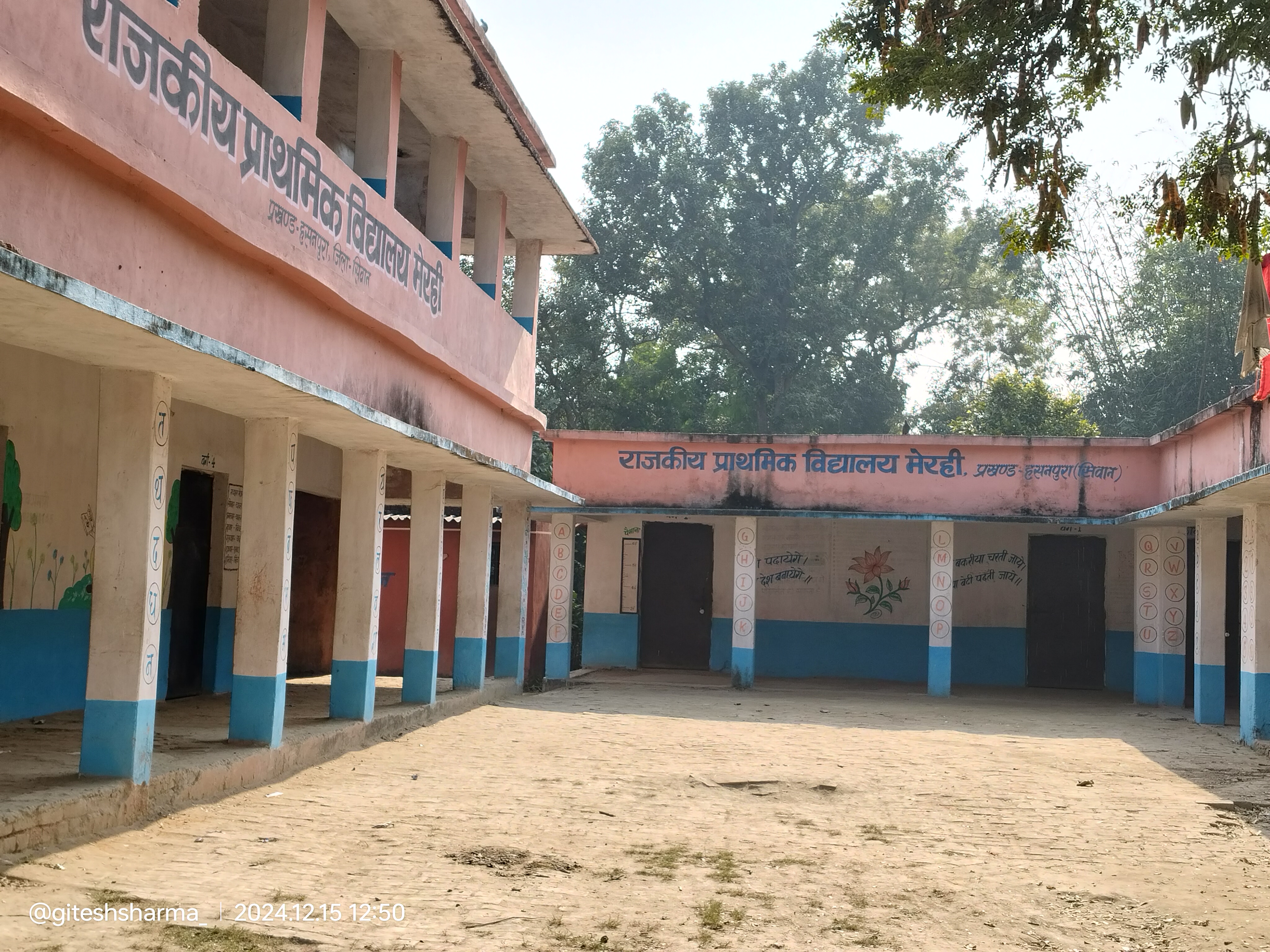
Primary School, Merahi

It's a co-educational institution serving students from Class 1 to 5, with instruction solely in Hindi.

== See also ==
- Pakari Gram Panchayat
- Dibi
- List of villages in Siwan district
- Siwan subdivision
- Administration in Bihar
- Daraunda Assembly constituency
- Siwan Lok Sabha constituency
