= Hrishikesh Sulabh =

Indian writer (born 1955)

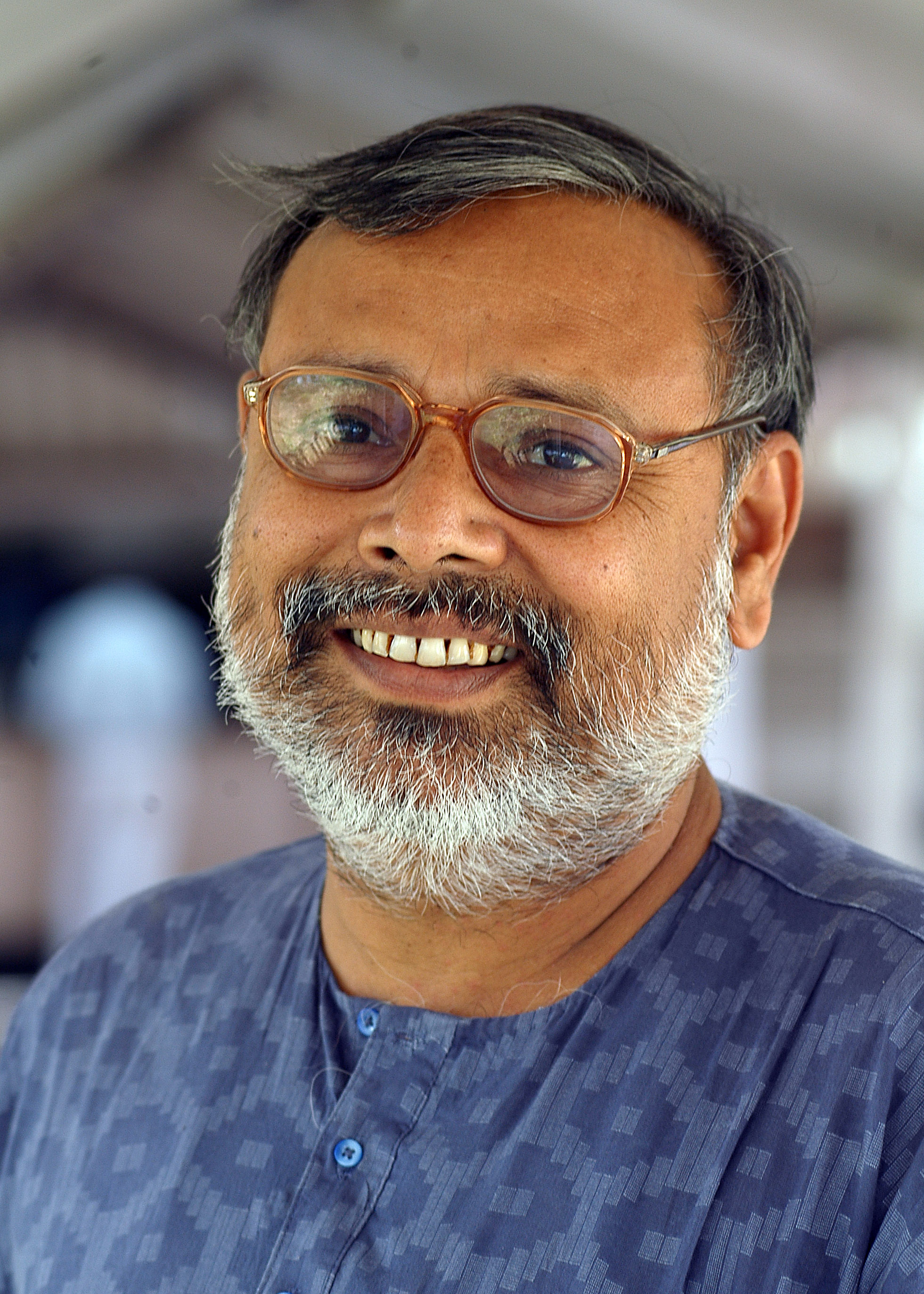
- Sulabh in 2006
- Born: 15 February 1955 (age 71); Laheji, Bihar, India
- Other name: Prabhat
- Education: Bachelor of Arts (Hons.), Hindi
- Alma mater: B.N. College, Patna University
- Known for: Prominent Figure of Indian literature and Theatre of India; Presenting rural reality in his works, especially short stories Using the device of Bideshiya Shaili in Modern Indian Theatre
- Spouse: Meena Shrivastava
- Children: Vatsala; Vasundhara; Vallari
- Parent(s): Binda Devi (Mother); Rama Shankar Shrivastava (Father)
- Awards: 1. Sangeet Natak Akademi Award, 2019, 2. 16th Indu Sharma International Katha Samman, 2010 by Katha UK, London; 3. Dr. Siddhnath Kumar Smriti Samman, 2009; 4. Banarasi Prasad Bhojpuri Samman; 5. Ramvriksha Benipuri Samman; 6. Anil Kumar Mukherji Shikhar Samman; 7. Pataliputra Award

Hrishikesh Sulabh (born 15 February 1955) is a Hindi writer. He is the recipient of the prestigious Sangeet Natak Akademi Award (2019), among various other awards. While he is best known for writing short stories and plays in Bideshiya Shaili, he has recently emerged as a boundary pushing novelist over the last decade. He worked with the All India Radio between 1980 and 2015. He is now retired and focuses on writing and interacting with young writers / poets / theater workers and activists. He divides his time between his home at Patna and various cities where his children and grandchildren live.

== Recent ==
- Sulabh's latest novel titled "Joothi Gali" (जूठी गली) has just been published by Rajkamal Prakashan. || 2025
- Hrishikesh Sulabh is awarded the 2019 Sangeet Natak Akademi Award, announced in 2022, for a lifetime of contribution to playwriting and theatre criticism.
- Sulabh's novel titled "Daataa Peer" (दाता पीर) has just been published by Rajkamal Prakashan. || 2022
- Sulabh's novel titled "Daataa Peer" (दाता पीर) was adopted into a play titled "Small Town Zindagi" and performed for the first time in Patna on 4th Aug 2024 at the Premchand Rangashala by the Raaga theatre group. It was directed by Randhir Kumar and Krishna Samdiddha.
- Sulabh's novel titled "Agnileek" (अग्निलीक) has just been published by Rajkamal Prakashan. || Nov 2019
- His latest short-story collection "Sankalit Kahaniya" (संकलित कहानियाँ) has been published by National Book Trust (राष्ट्रीय पुस्तक न्यास). || Nov 2019
- His representative short story collection has been published in the nationally reputed series "Pratinidhi Kahaniya" published by Rajkamal Prakashan || Feb 2018

== Life ==
Hrishikesh "Sulabh" was born in a small village (of Laheji, in district of Siwan, Bihar). He received his basic schooling in the village school at Laheji. The ambience of village stage and theatre led to the inculcation of theatrical values in him.

His father, who was a freedom fighter, moved to the city of Patna for Sulabh's further education. After completing his B.A. in Hindi, he went to pursue his master's degree in the same subject. Due to financial constraints and family responsibilities, he had to drop out after a year of his M.A. education.

As an optimisation between arranging his wherewithal and channelising his creative energies, he took up a job with All India Radio as an executive.

He married Meena Shrivastava on 26 April 1982 at the age of 28. At that time, she was the only graduate in her village (of Madhavpur, in district of Champaran, Bihar). He has three daughters, Vatsala, Vasundhara, and Vallari.

His life and works have been greatly influenced by his father, Dr. Rama Shankar Srivastava (Prasad), who was a homoeopathic doctor and a freedom fighter. Sulabh has been known for crediting his father for being exceptionally understanding. He mentions the freedom and faith extended by his father towards himself as the biggest motivating factors in the journey of his life. For the past three decades, Hrishikesh Sulabh, apart from writing plays and being a theatre activist, has been actively participating in the various cultural movements. His stories have been published in a plethora of magazines and at the same time, they have been translated into various languages, also in English. On account of his intense passion for theatre, he looked up towards writing plays along with story writing. ″Hrishikesh Sulabh″ has incorporated the theatrical skills and ideas of the famous drama style of ″Bhikhari Thakur″ .i.e. Bidesiya″ in his plays for the first time in a very creative style for the contemporary Hindi theatre. ″National School of Drama″ staged his play ″Batohi″. For the past few years he has been continuously writing for the literary magazine 'Kathadesh'.

″Dharti Aaba″ and Rani ka Sapna are Hrishikesh Sulabh's latest play.

== Awards ==
- 2019 Sangeet Natak Akademi Award, announced in 2022
- 2022 katha kram samman Sulabh, Hrishikesh (4 October 2022). "Katha Kram Samman". New18. news18.com.
- 10th Indu Sharma International Katha Samman 2010 by Katha UK
- Banarsi Prasad 'Bhojpuri' samman for short story writing in Hindi
- Anil Kumar Mukharji shikhar samman for theatre activities and play writing
- Ramvriksh Benipuri samman for play writing
- Pataliputra award for play writing and theatre
- Siddhnath Kumar smriti samman for play writing and theatre criticism
- 1st shashibhooshan smriti samman for play writing

== Work ==
His works can be broadly classified into three categories – plays, short stories, and theatre criticism.

=== Novels ===
- Joothee Gali (novel) जूठी गली (latest novel; 2025) (ISBN 978-93-60869-52-6)
- Daataa Peer (novel) दाता पीर (ISBN 978-93-92757-11-2)
- Agnileek (novel) अग्निलीक (debut novel) (ISBN 978-93-89577-40-2)

=== Plays ===
- Amli अमली
- Batohi बटोही (ISBN 8126713349)
- Dharti Aaba धरती आबा
- Daaliya दालिया (based on a story by Rabindranath Tagore)
- Mati Gadi माटी गाडी (Adaption of Mrichchakatikam, a Sanskrit play written by Shudrak)
- Maila Aanchal मैला आँचल (Adaptation of a novel by Phanishwar Nath 'Renu')

=== Short story collections ===
- Sankalit Kahaniyan संकलित कहानियाँ
- Pratinidhi Kahaniyan प्रतिनिधि कहानियाँ
- Halant हलंत
- Pattharkat पथरकट
- Vadhsthal se chalang वधस्थल से छ्लाँग
- Bandha Hai Kaal बँधा है काल
- Tuti Ki Aawaz तूती की आवाज़ (ISBN 81-267-1291-0)
- Vasant ke Hatyare वसंत के हत्यारे (ISBN 978-8126717866)

=== Theatre criticism ===
- Rang Manch Ka Jantantra -a book of theatre criticism रँगमंच का जनतंत्र (collection of Sulabh's article on theatre) (ISBN 978-8126717842)
- Regular column on theatre activities in KATHADESH, a Hindi monthly
- Regular column on theatre for a while in Hindi news magazine Lokayat
- Articles in various other newspapers and magazines Jagaran, Dainik Hindustan, Rashtriya Sahara
  - Shabdankan (शब्दांकन)
  - Sarika
  - Dharmyug
  - Lahar
  - Sakshatkar
  - Kathayatra
  - Ravivar
  - Vasudha
  - Samya
  - Ab kahani visheshank
  - Vartman Sahity
  - Hans
  - Kathan
  - Sabrang-Jansatta visheshank
  - Kathadesh
  - India Today and Sahity visheshank of India Today
  - Lokmat visheshank
  - Prabhat Khabar visheshank
  - Sambhav kahani visheshank
  - Janpath
  - Samkaleen Bhartiya Sahitya and others

His story Ashtabhujalal ki Bhujaein/ अष्ठभुजालाल की भुजाएँ (known after translation as Ashtabhujalalinte Bhujangal) was included in Theranjedutha Hindi Kathakal (translated and edited by V. K. Ravindranath)

== Interviews ==
Interview with online newspaper Navjivan India

Sangat Ep.39 Hrishikesh Sulabh on Stories, Agnileek, Daata Peer, Patna & Rangmanch Anjum Sharma
