= List of educational institutions in Siwan =

List of schools, colleges or institutions in Siwan district

This is a list of educational institutions in Siwan district, Bihar, India.

== General ==
- D.A.V. Post-Graduate College, Siwan
- Mamta Institute of Education, Daraundha
- Vidya Bhawan Mahila College, Siwan
- Ram Vilas Ganga Ram College, Maharajganj
- Narayan College, Goreyakothi
- Hariram College, Mairwa
- Daroga Prasad Rai College, Siwan
- Z. A. Islamia P. G. College, Siwan
- Mazhrul Haque Degree College, Tarwara
- Desh Ratan Rajaendra Prasad Degree College, Ziradei
- Mata Rojhni Devi Chhathu Ram Degree College, Mairwa
- Gorakh Singh College, Siwan
- Subhwanti Group of Institutions, Siwan

== Engineering institution ==
- Government Engineering College, Siwan
- Siwan Engineering and Technical Institute, Siwan

== Medical institution ==
- Z. H. Unani Medical College and Hospital, Naya Quilla, Siwan
- Daksh B.Sc. Nursing College, Daraundha, Siwan
- Rajendra Kishori Pharmacy College, Siwan
- Government Pharmacy College, Maharajganj
- Dayanand Ayurvedic Medical College And Hospital, Siwan

== Management institution ==
- SIBM College (Shahi Institute Of Business Management), Mahadeva Road, Siwan

== Schools ==
- Kendriya Vidyalaya Maharajganj
- Jawahar Navodaya Vidyalay, Tarwara, Siwan
- Kendriya Vidyalaya, Siwan
- Gandhi Smarak High School, Laheji
- Merahi Primary School, Siwan
- V. D. Prasad Yadav High School, Dibi
- Middle School, Mandrauli
- Emmanuel Mission High School, Siwan

== See also ==
- List of educational institutions in Bihar
- Education in Bihar
- List of schools in India
