= Kararua =

Kararua is a village in Siwan district, Bihar, India. It is located north-west of the district headquarters Siwan, at 26.27°N 84.36°E.

The village has approximately 300 houses. Agriculture is the main livelihood of the inhabitants.
