= Vasant Ke Hatyare =

Book by Hrishikesh Sulabh

Vasant ke Hatyare वसंत के हत्यारे
- First edition
- Author: Hrishikesh Sulabh
- Translator: Not yet translated
- Illustrator: Rajkamal Studio
- Cover artist: Rajkamal Prakashan Studio
- Language: Hindi
- Genre: Short Story Collection
- Publisher: Rajkamal Prakashan
- Publication date: 2009
- Publication place: India
- Pages: 128
- ISBN: 978-81-267-1786-6

Vasant ke Hatyare (Hindi: वसंत के हत्यारे) is a short story collection by Hrishikesh Sulabh, comprising 9 stories in Hindi written over 10 years from 2003 to 2009. It has won the author the 16th Indu Sharma International Katha Samman given by Katha UK.

== Publisher's Note (translated from Hindi) ==
As per Rajkamal Prakashan, the stories in Hrishikesh Sulabh’s collection, ‘Vasant Ke Hatyare’ (The Assassins of Spring), present the development of the realist fiction tradition in Hindi literature. These stories not only express the tradition, philosophy of life, contemporary realities, and concerns of Indian society but also portray its distortions and inconsistencies. The artistic effort to traverse the inner, inaccessible paths of human existence and nature, and to highlight the premonitions and signs of the future, gives these stories a distinct identity. Amidst the deeper layers of reality, numerous such instances spontaneously emerge, expanding the poignancy of our lives. The echoes of a stored past extend the sensitivity here, and transcending the temporality of this very past, reality creates the vastness of life.

Hrishikesh Sulabh’s stories, at the level of language and craft, develop a new technique for the communication of new emotional sensibilities. In the process of etching new shades of meaning, the craft of these stories sometimes immerses the reader in the depth of an 'alap' (a slow, melodic introductory section in Indian classical music), and sometimes effortlessly connects them to the poignancy of the folk rhythm. These stories, which mold the throbbing pulse of life into narrative episodes and expand life’s sensitivity, forge an intimate and intense relationship with the readers.

The narrative world of Hrishikesh Sulabh contains the hustle and bustle of the crowd alongside solitude. There is a journey through scorching sunlight alongside the soft images of dreams. There is the tremor of sweaty palms, but also the magnificence of hands waving with confidence. These stories, which acquire their ultimate meaning through emotions and sensibilities, depict how the sapling of life sprouts even amidst cruelty and deceit, underscoring the peak of human sensitivity and the intensity of the will to live.

=== Editions in print ===
- India – ISBN 978-81-267-1786-6

Work under progress
