= Faridabad (disambiguation) =

Faridabad is a city in Haryana, India.

It may also refer to:

- Greater Faridabad
- Faridabad district
- Faridabad Lok Sabha constituency
- Faridabad Combined Cycle Power Plant
- Faridabad Thermal Power Station
- Faridabad New Town railway station
- Faridabad railway station
- Old Faridabad metro station
- Faridabad Madrasa, Bangladesh

== See also ==
- Faridabad Municipal Corporation
- Delhi–Faridabad Skyway
- Faridabad–Noida–Ghaziabad Expressway
- Faridpur (disambiguation)
