= Pakari, Siwan =

Village in Siwan, Bihar

Pakari पकड़ी
- Gram Panchayat
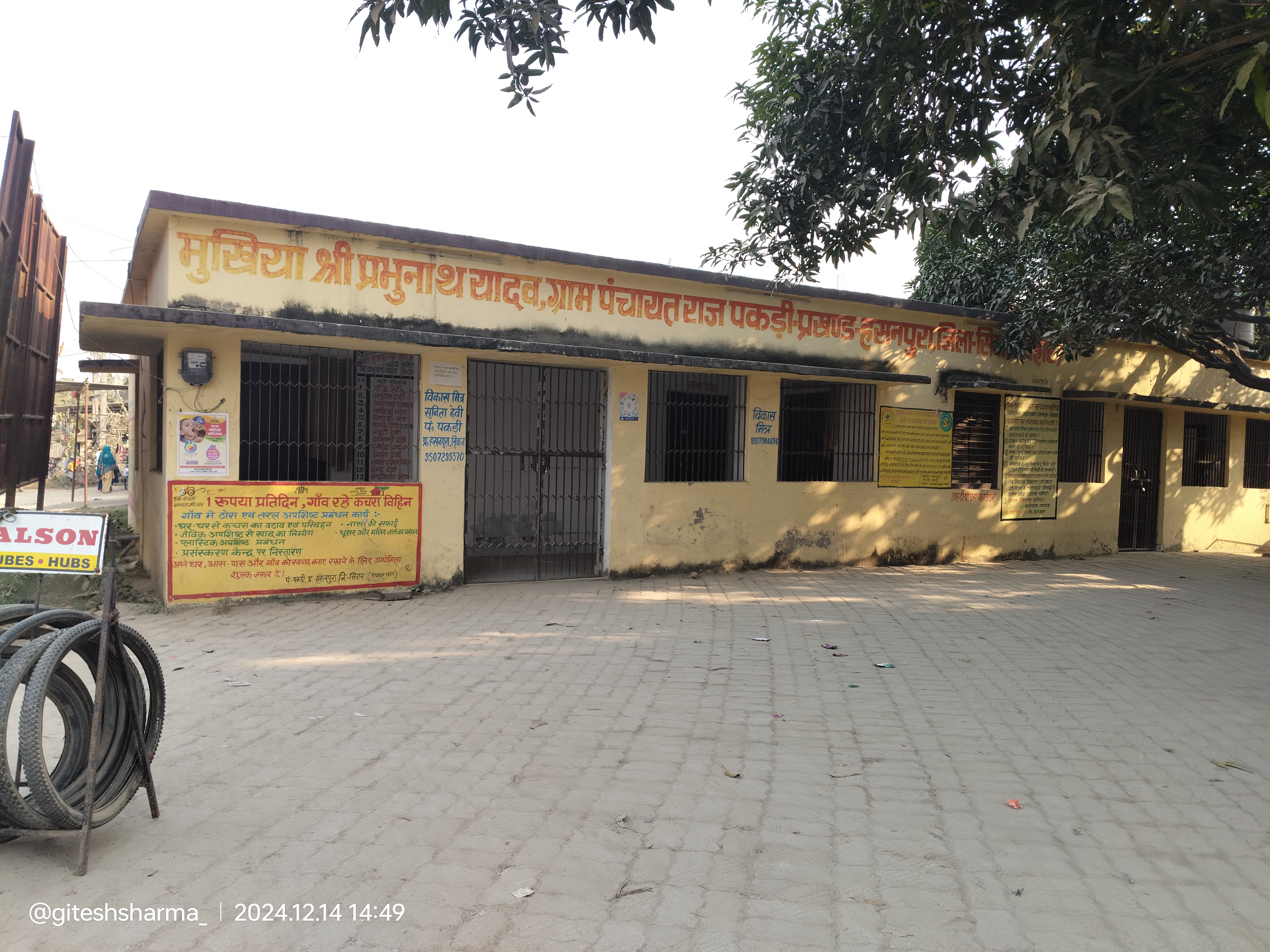
- Front of Panchayat Office, Pakari
- Pakari (#584) in Hasanpura block map
- Location in Bihar
- Coordinates: 26°03′31″N 84°25′07″E
- Country: India
- State: Bihar
- District: Siwan district
- Block: Hasanpura

Government
  - Type: Local Government
  - Body: Panchayati Raj
  - Panchayat: Pakari
  - Mukhiya: Rita Devi
  - Lok Sabha constituency: Siwan
  - Assembly seat: Daraunda

Area
  - Total: 1.5125 km^{2} (0.5840 sq mi)

Population (2,011 Census)
  - Total: 2,450
  - Density: 1,620/km^{2} (4,200/sq mi)

Languages
  - Official: Hindi & English
  - Regional: Bhojpuri

Demographics
  - Literacy: 54.29%
  - Sex ratio: 1126 (Males: 1,152 - 65.54%, Females: 1,298 - 44.30%)
- Time zone: UTC+5:30 (IST)
- PIN: 841240
- ISO 3166 code: IN-BR
- Vehicle registration: BR29
- Website: siwan.bih.nic.in

Pakari or Pakri is a gram panchayat located in the Hasanpura block of Siwan district in the Indian state of Bihar, India.

== Geography ==
Pakari covers a total area of approximately 1.51 km^{2}. Agriculture is the primary occupation due to rich alluvial soil.

== Administration ==
Pakari functions under the Panchayati Raj system. The village is governed by a Gram Panchayat and administrated by an elected Mukhiya. As of the latest available data, the Mukhiya is Lt.Prabhunath Yadav.

== Demographics ==
As per the 2011 Census of India, Pakari has a total population of 2,450 living in 397 households. There are 1,152 males and 1298 females, resulting in a sex ratio of 928 females per 1,000 males.

=== Age distribution ===
Children aged 0–6 years number 406, accounting for 16.56% of the population. The child sex ratio is 954, higher than the Bihar average of 935.

=== Literacy ===
According to the 2011 Census, the literacy rate in Pakri is 54.29%. The male literacy rate is 65.54%, while the female literacy rate is 44.30%.

== Villages in panchayat ==
- Dibi
- Merahi
- Chandparsha
- Shekhpura
- Mahual-Mahal

== See also ==
- Hasanpura
- Siwan district
- Panchayati raj (India)
- List of villages in Siwan district
- Siwan subdivision
- Administration in Bihar
- Daraunda Assembly constituency
- Siwan Lok Sabha constituency
