= Chachopali =

- Country: India
- State: Bihar
- Administrative division: Saran
- Headquarters: Maharajganj

Government
  - Lok Sabha constituency: Maharajganj
  - Assembly seat: Goriakothi
- Elevation: 66 m (217 ft)

Population (2014 census)
  - Total: 1,025

Demographics
  - Literacy: 60 per cent
  - Sex ratio: 1,025 (Males: 538 - 52.48%, Females: 487- 47.51)
- Time zone: UTC+5:30 (IST)
- PIN: 841506
- Area code: 06154

Chachopali is a small village/hamlet in the Goriakothi block of the Siwan district in Indian state of Bihar. It comes under Chachopali Panchayath and is part of Saran Division. It is located at a distance of 17 km from the city of Siwan and 120 km from the state capital Patna. Chachopali's Postal Index Number is 841506. Chachopali is surrounded by the Sidhwaliya block on the north, the Basantpur block on the south, the Lakri Nabiganj block on the east, and the Barauli block on the North.

== Nearest airports ==
- Kushinagar Airport, Kushinagar (92.1 km or 57.2 mi)
- Lok Nayak Jayaprakash Airport, Patna (110.3 km or 68.5 mi)
