= Khanpur Khairanti =

Village in Bihar, India

Coordinates: 26°09′N 84°20′E

Khanpur Khairanti is a village situated in Siwan district of Bihar state, India. The same district where first President of India Dr. Rajendra Prasad was born. According to the 2011 Census the location code or village code of Khanpur Khairanti village is 232015. Khanpur Khairanti village is located in Hussainganj Tehsil of Siwan district in Bihar, India. It is situated 10 km away from district headquarter Siwan. Hussainganj is the block headquarter of Khanpur Khairanti village. As per 2009 stats, Khanpur Khairati is the gram panchayat of Khanpur Khairanti village.

== Geography ==
The total geographical area of village is 240 hectares. Khanpur Khairanti has a total population of 8,480 peoples. There are about 1,301 houses in Khanpur Khairanti village. Siwan is nearest town to Khanpur Khairanti which is approximately 10 km away.

== Population ==
Population of Khanpur Khairanti

Total Population 8,480 Male Population 4,369 Female Population 4,111

== Caste Factor ==
Schedule Caste (SC) constitutes 10.44% while Schedule Tribe (ST) were 0.01% of total population in Khanpur Khairanti village.

== Work Profile ==
In Khanpur Khairanti village out of total population, 1994 were engaged in work activities. 63.29% of workers describe their work as Main Work (Employment or Earning more than 6 Months) while 36.71% were involved in Marginal activity providing livelihood for less than 6 months. Of 1994 workers engaged in Main Work, 103 were cultivators (owner or co-owner) while 382 were Agricultural labourer.

== Connectivity of Khanpur Khairanti ==
Public Bus Service Available within village Private Bus Service Available within village Railway Station Available 10 km from village
