= Madhupur =

Madhupur may refer to several places:

== Bangladesh ==
- Madhupur, Bangladesh, a town in Tangail District
- Madhupur Upazila, Tangail District

== India ==
- Madhupur, Deoghar, Jharkhand
- Madhupur Junction, Deoghar, Jharkhand
  - Madhupur Junction railway station
- Madhupur (community development block), Jharkhand
- Madhupur (Vidhan Sabha constituency), Jharkhand
- Madhupur, Diglipur, Andman & Nicobar Islands
- Madhupur, Manipur, Jiribam district
- Madhupur, Sonbhadra, Uttar Pradesh
- Madhupur, Chanditala-I, Hooghly district, West Bengal

== See also ==
- Madhopur (disambiguation)
