= Mihir Diwakar =

Indian cricketer (born 1982)

Personal information
- Born: 10 December 1982 (age 43); Siwan, Bihar, India
- Source: ESPNcricinfo, 12 December 2016

Mihir Diwakar (born 10 December 1982) is an Indian cricketer. He played 39 first-class and 36 List A matches between 1999 and 2009. He was also part of India's squad for the 2000 Under-19 Cricket World Cup.
