= Government Engineering College, Siwan =

Technical institute in Siwan, India

- GEC Siwan
- Motto: विद्या ददाति विनियम
- Type: Government
- Established: 2018 (8 years ago)
- Affiliations: Bihar Engineering University
- Faculty: 50
- Administrative staff: 30
- Students: 194
- Undergraduates: 194
- Location: Siwan, Bihar, 841226, India; 26.1960772°N 84.3810592°E
- Campus: Rural
- Acronym: GEC
- Nickname: GCE Siwan
- Website: www.gecsiwan.org
- Location within Bihar Location within India

Government Engineering College, Siwan (GEC Siwan) is a technical institute in Siwan, India. It is popularly known as Siwan Engineering College. It is approved by AICTE and is affiliated with Bihar Engineering University. The college is managed by Department of Science and Technology, Bihar.

== Courses ==
The institute offers full-time Bachelor of Technology (B.Tech.) degree programs in following disciples.

- Electrical engineering
- Mechanical engineering
- Civil engineering

== History ==
It was established in 2018 by the government of Bihar under the department of science and technology.

Its first academic session (2018–19) was held at a temporary campus on the campus of Government Polytechnic College, Siwan.

== Departments ==
GEC Siwan offers undergraduate courses in:

Departmental Courses in B.Tech. offered	Intake and seats available
B.Tech. Electrical Engineering	120 (Normal Entry Seats)
B.Tech. Mechanical Engineering	60 (Normal Entry Seats)
B.Tech. Civil Engineering	60 (Normal Entry Seats)

== Admission ==
Until 2018, the Bihar Combined Entrance Competitive Examination Board (BCECEB) conducted an exam based on the Merit List of the Bihar Combined Entrance Competitive Examination. Successful candidates attended an online counseling procedure.

From 2019 onward, admissions in state engineering colleges of Bihar were based on applicant's JEE mains rank. Students have to fill the application form on the BCECE Board website for admission.

== Campus ==
GEC Siwan Temporary campus is located at Loknayak Jai Prakash Institute of Technology Campus, Chapra, Bihar – 841301. A permanent campus is to be built by 2020.

== College facilities ==
- College Library
- Different clubs for student
- Computer LAB
- Anti-ragging committee

== See also ==
- Education in India
- Education in Bihar
- List of educational institutions in Siwan
- All India Council for Technical Education
