= Sirisiya =

- Village
- Location in Bihar, India Sirisiya (India)
- Coordinates: 26.281°N 84.221°E
- Country: India
- State: Bihar
- District: Siwan District

Population (2011)
  - Total: 2,586
- Time zone: UTC+5:30 (IST)
- Postal code: 841243
- ISO 3166 code: IN-BR
- Website: siwan.bih.nic.in

Sirisiya is a village in Mairwa block of Siwan district, Bihar. As of 2011 it had a population of 2,586 people spread across 308 households. The village has a sex ratio (females per 1,000 males) of 1,011.

== Infrastructure ==
The village is connected by road to Siwan, the headquarter town of the Siwan District.

== Schools ==
=== Primary schools ===
- Government Primary School
- Choudhary Tola Primary School

== Hospital ==
There is no hospital, but there is Primary Health Center in the village.

== Panchayat ==
- Sirisiya village is part of Barka Manjha Gram Panchayat, and former mukhiya Mr.Jagdish Puri.
