= Faridpur Village =

Faridpur is a small village located in Hussainganj Block of Siwan District of Bihar State.

Faridpur is a small village situated on the banks of the river Daha, this river is a tributary of the Ganges River.
