= Madhopur, Siwan =

Madhopur
- Village
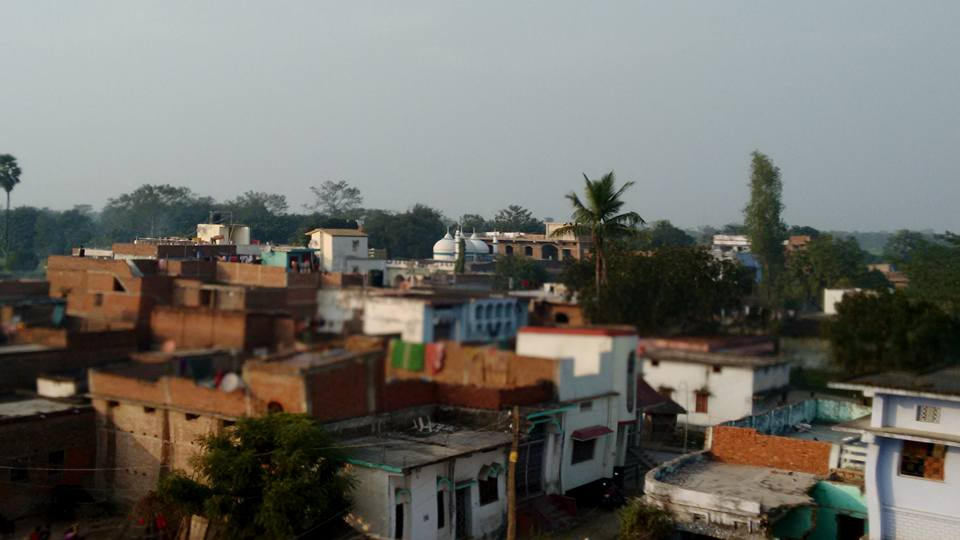
- Madhopur

- Location in Bihar, India
- Coordinates: 26.34°N 84.45°E
- Country: India
- State: Bihar
- District: Siwan
- Block: Barharia

Government
  - Type: Bihar Government
- Elevation: 70.198 m (230.31 ft)

Population (2010)
  - Total: 11,047

Languages
  - Official: Bhojpuri, Hindi, Urdu, English
- Time zone: UTC+5:30 (IST)
- PIN: 841232
- Telephone code: 06154
- Sex ratio: 806 per 1000 ♂/♀

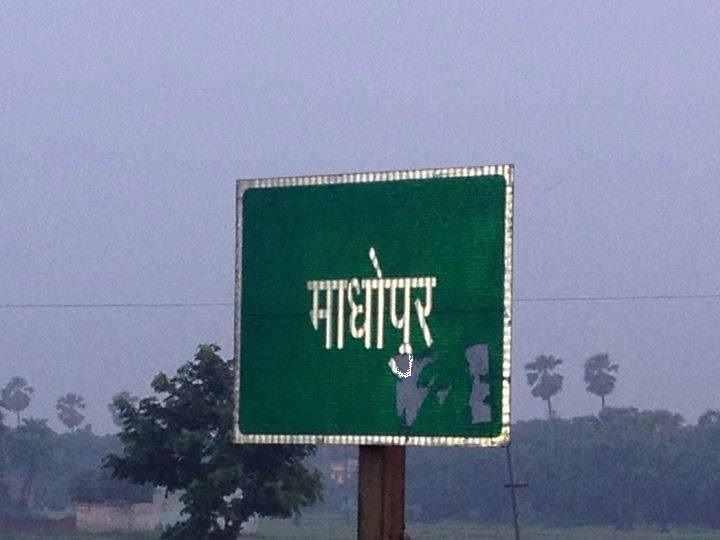
Madhopur

Madhopur is a village in Barharia block of Siwan district in the Indian state of Bihar. It is located 2 kilometers (1.24 mi) north of the Barharia block at Barharia-Gopalganj road, It is located 18 kilometres (11 mi) east of the district headquarters Siwan and 150 kilometres (93 mi) from the state capital Patna. Madhopur is surrounded by Sahpur to the north, Barasra south, Chhatisi east, and Rasulpur to the west. Barharia, Siwan, Gopalganj, Mirganj, Barauli and Thawe are nearby towns.

There are six villages in Madhopur Panchayat: Madhopur, Kalu Chhapra, Mira Chhapra, Chhakka Tola

== Demographics ==
Languages spoken in Madhopur include Bhojpuri (a language in the Bihari language group with almost 40,000,000 speakers), written in both the Devanagari (English) and Kaithi scripts.

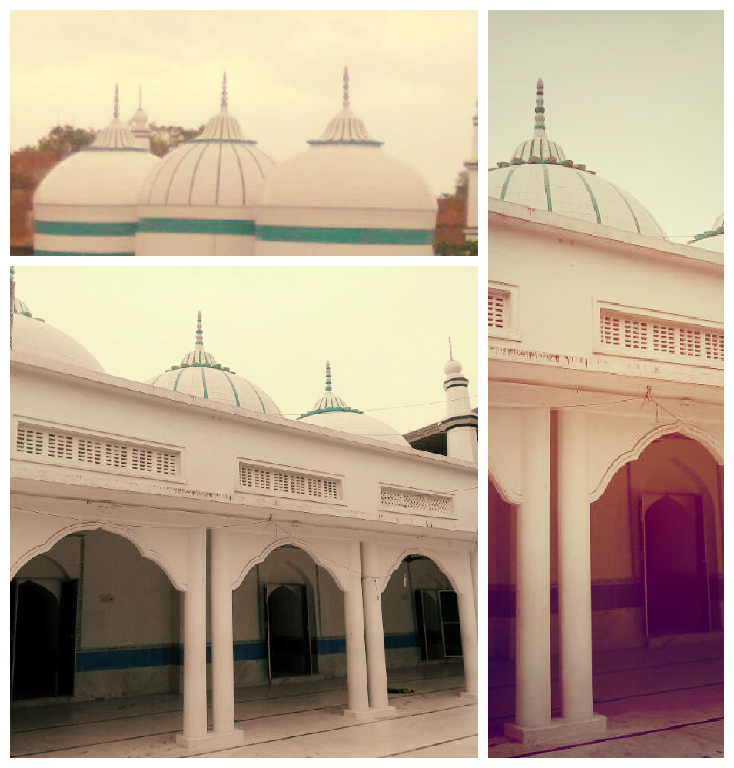
Madarsa Anwarul Islam

== Climate ==
- Subtropical, dry climate with distinct winter, summer and rainy season
- Highest temperature = 43.0 °C (May–June)
- Lowest temperature = 6.0 °C (December–January)
- Average rainfall = 800 millimetres (31 in)
- Monsoon = July to September
- Humidity = 10 – 15% (summer), 60% (rainy)
- Visit season = October–May

== Sports ==
The village is represented by MP XI Cricket Club and Sadbhawna Volleyball Club.

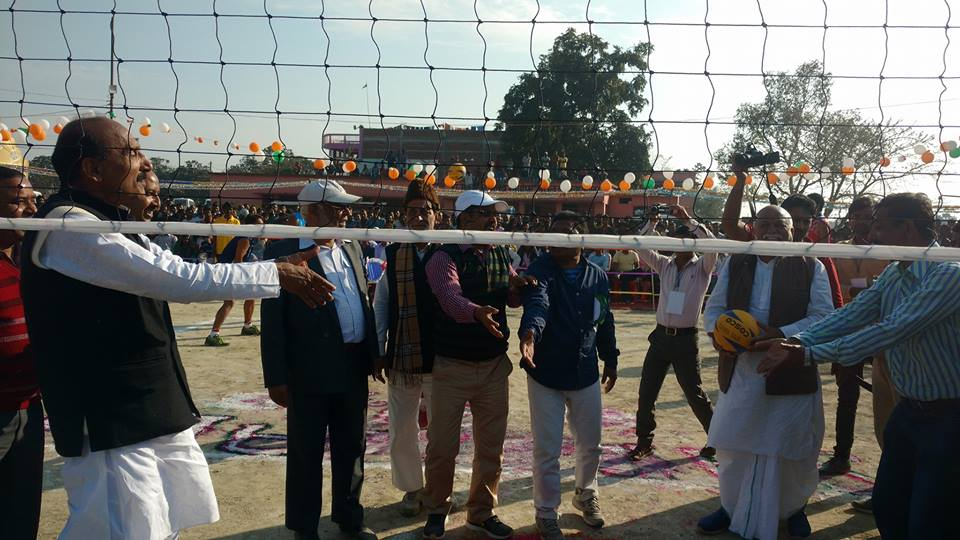
Guest Sadbhawna Cup 2017

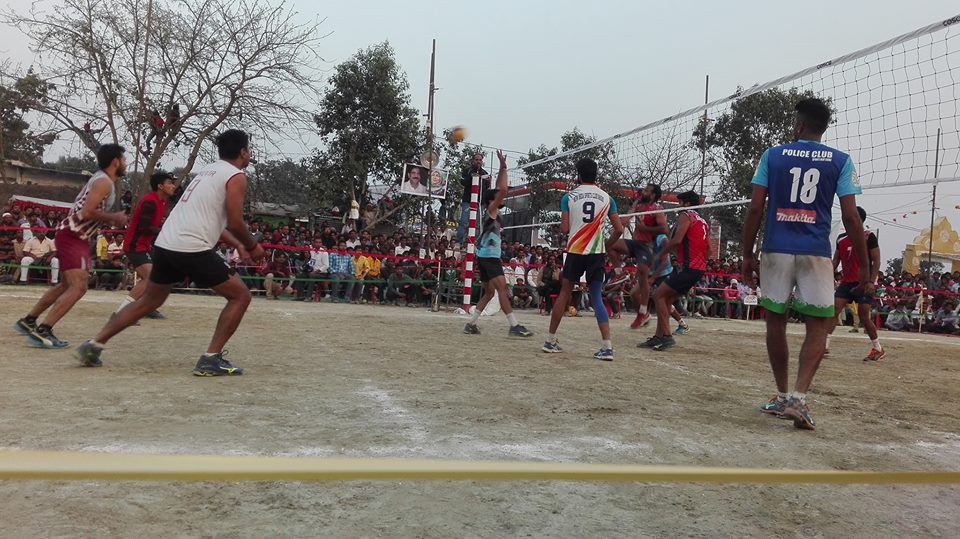
Sadbhawna Cup 2017

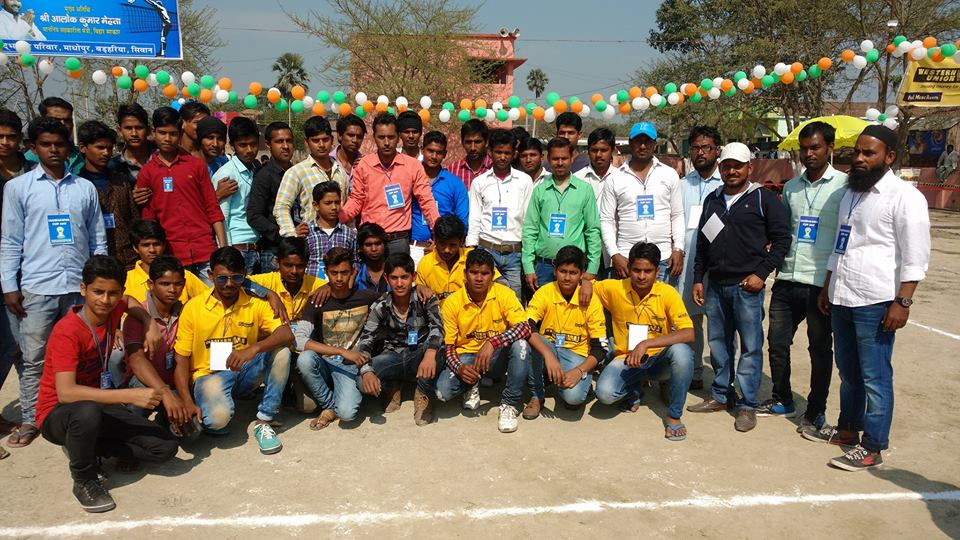
Volunteer Sadhbhawna Cup 2017

== Transportation ==
Madhopur is well connected with Barharia, Gopalganj and Mirganj by local taxi services on shared basis and with Patna by the Gopalganj-Patna bus service (via Barharia, Siwan and Chhapra) which one can board at Madhopur Middle School bus stand. The nearest railway station is Siwan Junction.

=== Roads ===
SH-45 (Gopalganj Maharajganj Road) and MDR 24 (Mirganj Barharia Road) state highway pass through the village.

== See also ==
- Barharia (Vidhan Sabha constituency)
