= Sadiqpur railway station =

Railway station in Pakistan

General information
- Coordinates: 29.7569°N 72.7875°E
- Owner: Ministry of Railways

Other information
- Station code: SFP

History
- Former names: Great Indian Peninsula Railway
Location

Sadiqpur railway station (Urdu: صادق پور ریلوے اسٹیشن) is located in Pakistan. The station is closed.

== See also ==
- List of railway stations in Pakistan
- Pakistan Railways
