= Vidya Bhawan Mahila College =

Degree college in Siwan, Bihar

- विद्या भवन महिला महाविद्यालय
- Type: Undergraduate Public College
- Established: 1977; 49 years ago
- Location: Siwan, Bihar, 841301
- Language: Hindi
- Website: Official website

Vidya Bhawan Mahila College is a degree college in Siwan, Bihar, India. It is a constituent unit of Jai Prakash University. The college offers intermediate and three years degree course (TDC) in arts.

== History ==
The college was established in the year 1977.

== Departments ==
- Arts
  - Hindi
  - Urdu
  - English
  - Sanskrit
  - Philosophy
  - Economics
  - Political Science
  - History
  - Geography
  - Psychology
  - Music
  - Home Science
