= Mahammadpur =

Village in Bihar, India

Mahammadpur, India
- Village
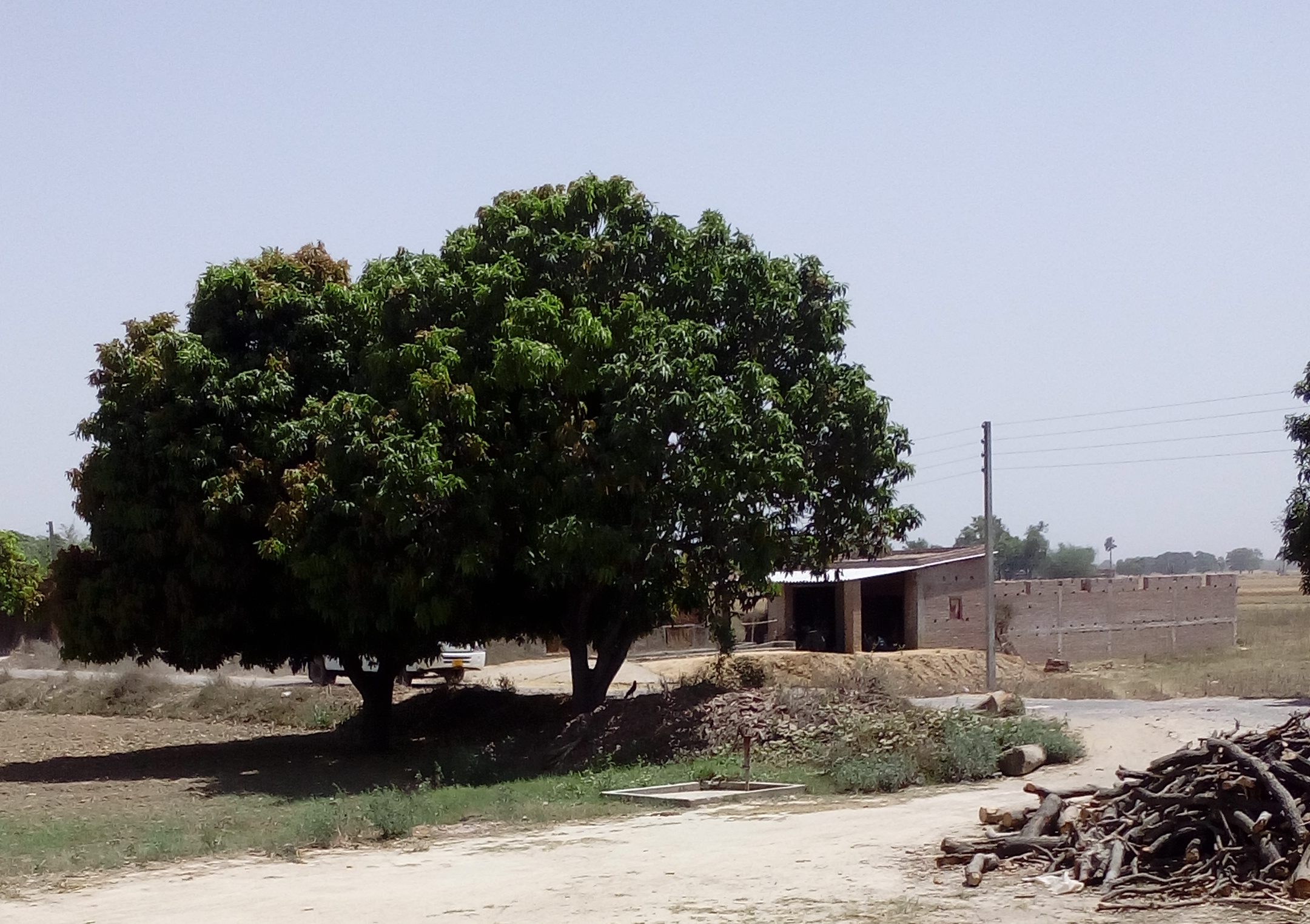

- Location in Bihar, India
- Coordinates: 26.115748°N 84.205482°E
- Country: India
- State: Bihar
- District: Siwan
- Block: Andar
- Gram Panchayat: Arkpur

Government
  - Chief Minister: Samrat Chaudhary
  - MP: Vijaylakshmi Devi
  - MLA: Vishnu Deo Paswan

Area
  - Total: 1.5 km^{2} (0.58 sq mi)
  - Rank: 200
- Elevation: 234 m (768 ft)

Population (2011)
  - Total: 1,343
  - Density: 900/km^{2} (2,300/sq mi)

Languages
  - Local: Bhojpuri; Hindi; ENGLISH
- Time zone: UTC+5:30 (IST)
- PIN: 841245-87
- Vehicle registration: BR-29
- Lok Sabha constituency: Siwan
- Vidhan Sabha constituency: Darauli
- Website: siwan.bih.nic.in

Mahammadpur is a village in the Siwan district of Bihar, India. It has a population of approximately 1,343 and has a size of 1.5 km^{2} (0.58 sq mi).

== Government ==
Mahammadpur is represented by a Sarpanch, who is elected by the people of the village and has judicial powers to punish and impose fines.

== Wards ==
This village has two wards named ward no.08 and ward no.09 respectively.

== Geography ==
Mahammadpur is located at 26.11°N 84.2050°E. It has an average elevation of 223 metres (223 feet).
