= Faridpur, Khanewal =

Faridpur
- Location within Pakistan
- Coordinates: 30.32°N 71.52°E
- Country: Pakistan
- Province: Punjab
- Elevation: 121 m (397 ft)
- Time zone: UTC+5 (PST)

Faridpur is a village in the Punjab province of Pakistan. It is located in Khanewal District at 30°32'0N 71°52'0E with an altitude of 121 metres (400 feet).
