= Faridpur, Multan =

Faridpur
- Location within Pakistan
- Coordinates: 30.3°N 71.34°E
- Country: Pakistan
- Province: Punjab
- Elevation: 120 m (390 ft)
- Time zone: UTC+5 (PST)

Faridpur (Urdu: فرِيد پُور, Punjabi: فریدپور) is a village in the Punjab province of Pakistan. It is located in Multan District at 30°3'0N 71°34'0E with an elevation of 120 metres (390 ft). It lies southeast of the district capital, Multan.
