= Sadiha =

Village in India

- Village
- Location in Bihar, India Sadiha (India)
- Coordinates: 26.1214°N 84.5946°E
- Country: India
- State: Bihar
- Siwan: Siwan District

Population
  - Total: 1,592 (2,011 Census)

Languages
  - Official: Bhojpuri, Hindi, English
- Time zone: UTC+5:30 (IST)
- Postal code: 841507
- ISO 3166 code: IN-BR
- Website: siwan.bih.nic.in

Sadiha is a village in Siwan district of Bihar, India. There is a nearby railway station named as sarhari railway station which comes under village sadiha . It is home to the Vishnudham Mandir temple and Kali Mandir (काली मंदिर) Hanuman Mandir, Shiv Mandir and Chhath Ghat. Nearby markets include Patedha, Patedhi, Mora, Janta Bazar and Maharajganj. Durga Puja, Chhath Puja, Sarswati Puja, Holi, Diwali is there major festivals.

Sadiha is a small Village/hamlet in Bhagwanpur Hat Block in Siwan District of Bihar State, India. It comes under Sadiha Panchayath. It belongs to Saran Division . It is located 32 KM towards East from District head quarters Siwan. 10 KM from Bhagwanpur Hat. 91 KM from State capital Patna

Sadiha Pin code is 841507 and postal head office is Mora (Siwan).

Deoria (4 KM), Baiju Barhoga (4 KM), Bithuna (4 KM), Ramgarha (5 KM), Rajapur (5 KM) are the nearby Villages to Sadiha. Sadiha is surrounded by Maharajganj Block towards west, Basantpur Block towards East, Lahladpur Block towards South, Daraundha Block towards west .

Maharajganj, Siwan, Barauli, Marhaura are the near by Cities to Sadiha.

This Place is in the border of the Siwan District and Saran District. Saran District Lahladpur is South towards this place .

Sadiha Local Language is Bhojpuri. Sadiha Village Total population is 1592 and number of houses are 226. Female Population is 46.6%. Village literacy rate is 60.1% and the Female Literacy rate is 22.9%.

Schools in Sadiha

P.s. Sadiha Address : sadiha, bhagwanpur hatt, siwan, Bihar . PIN- 841507, Post - Mora (Siwan)

Colleges near Sadiha

K.n.s.j.inter Collage Sarauti Phulprash Madhubani Address : Umashankar Singh College Address : D C Inter College Address : Tarwara Road Safi Chhapra Barharia Bkara 1 Collage Gyaspur (siwan) Address : Bkara City, Gyaspur (siwan) Rama Nanad Yadav Inter College(mitwar) Address : Vill-mitwar.po.gaighat

== Population ==
Census Parameter	Census Data
Total Population	1592
Total No of Houses	226
Female Population %	46.6 % (742)
Total Literacy rate %	60.1 % (956)
Female Literacy rate	22.9 % (365)
Scheduled Tribes Population %	0.1 % (1)
Scheduled Caste Population %	2.9 % (46)
Working Population %	23.2 %
Child(0 -6) Population by 2011	238
Girl Child(0 -6) Population % by 2011	48.3 % (115)
