= Jataur =

- Village
- Location in the India
- Coordinates: 26°11′44″N 84°5′17″E
- Country: India
- State: Bihar
- district: Siwan
- Block: Guthani
- Panchayat: Jataur
- PIN Code: 841239
- Established: 1805s

Government
  - Chief Minister: Nitish Kumar (JD(U))
  - MP: Kavita Singh (JD(U))
  - MLA: Satyadeo Ram (CPI(ML)(L))

Population (2011)
  - Estimate (2011): 1,500

Jataur is a small panchyat village situated on the bank of SH-47, comes under Guthani Block, Darauli (Vidhan Sabha Constituency) and Siwan (Lok Sabha Constituency) in District-Siwan, Bihar, India. There are 11 villages (Jamuaw, Jataur, Bhagwanpur, Bhalua, Khap Jataur, Rewasi, Pachnerue, Chakiya, Bhalue, Khap Mishouli and Pachnerua) in Jataur Panchyat.

== About Jataur ==
As its history is not so old, its population is around 1500 people who mainly use to speak Bhojpuri and Hindi. Around 5% of its population doing business in Thailand, 10% population doing service and others are depend on agriculture and some other local business. Due to the improvement of source of income of village its literacy rate also improving and reached to around 65%. With time this village improve the source of education as it has one government school and around 5 private school till eighth standard. Students of this village still going 3 km far for secondary school and 8 km far for college.

== Geography ==
Jataur is situated at 26°11'44"N 84°5'17"E on the bank of SH-47 in Bihar, India. It is 6.8 km distance from its Tehsil Darauli, 29.4 km from its district Siwan and 173 km from state capital city Patna. Its surrounded by 75 Acre long pond family in North which is a heritage of Rajput and a canal in south. Due to the good geography, big pond and canal, the villagers earn good income from agriculture and fishery.

== History ==
According to the villagers this village is established by a Rajput Zamindar, who came from Ibrahimpatti, Ballia, Uttar Pradesh with his two sons, Kadam Singh and Dehal Singh, in 1805. According to their need they colonise Harijan, Koeri, Gond, Kamkar and Kumbhar in village and Bramhan in nearby village Kareji. They all live a healthy and happy life with living together in this village.
