= Gauri, Siwan =

Gauri
- Village
- Location in Bihar, India
- Coordinates: 26.08591°N 84.21405°E
- Country: India
- State: Bihar
- District: Siwan
- Block: Daruali
- Gram Panchayat: Gauri

Government
  - Chief Minister: Nitish Kumar (JD(U))
  - MP: Om Prakash Yadav (BJP)
  - MLA: Satyadeo Ram (CPI(M/L)(L))

Area
  - Total: 2 km^{2} (0.77 sq mi)
  - Rank: 200
- Elevation: 234 m (768 ft)

Population (2011)
  - Total: 5,897
  - Density: 2,900/km^{2} (7,600/sq mi)

Languages
  - Local: Bhojpuri; Hindi; ENGLISH
- Time zone: UTC+5:30 (IST)
- PIN: 841234
- Vehicle registration: BR-29
- Lok Sabha constituency: Siwan
- Vidhan Sabha constituency: Darauli
- Website: siwan.bih.nic.in

Gauri is a village in Siwan district of Bihar, India. In 2011, it had a population of 5,897. Its area is 2 km^{2} (0.77 sq mi).
