= Madhopur, Rautahat =

Madhopur माधोपुर
- Village Development Committee
- Location in Nepal
- Coordinates: 26.89°N 85.34°E
- Country: Nepal
- Zone: Narayani Zone
- District: Rautahat District

Population (1991)
  - Total: 4,444
- Time zone: UTC+5:45 (Nepal Time)

Madhopur is a Village Development Committee in Rautahat District in the Narayani Zone of south-eastern Nepal. At the time of the 1991 Nepal census it had a population of 4,444 people residing in 858 individual households.
