= Faridpur, Narowal =

Faridpur
- Location within Pakistan
- Coordinates: 32.9°N 75.2°E
- Country: Pakistan
- Province: Punjab
- Elevation: 239 m (784 ft)
- Time zone: UTC+5 (PST)

Faridpur is a village in the Punjab province of Pakistan. It is located in Narowal District at 32°9′0″N 75°2′0″E with an altitude of 239 metres (787 feet) above sea level and lies near to the Indian border.
