= Bhada Kalan =

Coordinates: 26°14′N 84°19′E

Bhada Kalan is a small hamlet in Siwan Block in Siwan District of Bihar state, India. As of 1981, the village had an area of 144.47 hectares and a population of 2210.

== Languages ==
Bhojpuri is the local language spoken in this area.
