= Hussainganj =

- Town
- Location in Uttar Pradesh, India Hussainganj (India)
- Coordinates: 25.92°N 80.82°E
- Country: India
- State: Uttar Pradesh
- District: Fatehpur

Languages
  - Official: Hindi
- Time zone: UTC+5:30 (IST)
- Vehicle registration: Uttar Pardesh
- Website: up.gov.in

Hussainganj is a village and town of Fatehpur district in the state of Uttar Pradesh, India.
