= Sadikpur, Siwan =

Sadikpur
- Village
- Interactive map of Sadikpur
- Coordinates: 26.167475°N 84.431112°E
- Postal Index Number: 801503

Sadikpur is a village in the Siwan District of Bihar, India. It is situated on the Pachrukhi—Tarwara state highway.
