= Rajkamal Prakashan =

Publishing House

- Founded: 1947
- Founder: Om Prakash
- Country of origin: India
- Headquarters location: Daryaganj, New Delhi
- Key people: Amod Maheshwari and Alind Maheshwari
- Publication types: Books, Journals, Sheet music
- Imprints: Rajkamal Prakashan; Radhakrishna Prakashan; Lokbharti Prakashan; Banyan Tree Books
- No. of employees: more than 150
- Official website: www.rajkamalprakashan.com

Rajkamal Prakashan is a noted publishing house of Hindi literature as well as English book publication. Established in 1947, the publishing house is headquartered in New Delhi, with branches in Patna, Ranchi, Prayagraj, Kolkata and some other locations.

Currently the publication has three other imprints besides Rajkamal Prakashan, Radhakrishna Prakashan, Lokbharti Prakashan and Banyan Tree Books, which publishes books in English.

Rajkamal is also a publisher for the Indian Council of Historical Research based in Delhi.
