= Hasanpura =

Community development block in Siwan district, Bihar, India

- CD block
- Hasanpura block map
- Location in Bihar, India
- Coordinates: 26°4′53.73″N 84°21′48.52″E
- Country: India
- State: Bihar
- District: Siwan
- Subdivision: Siwan
- Headquarters: Hasanpura (town)

Government
  - Type: Community development
  - Body: Hasanpura block

Area
  - Total: 96.56 km^{2} (37.28 sq mi)

Population (2011)
  - Total: 149,580
  - Density: 1,549/km^{2} (4,012/sq mi)

Languages
  - Official: Bhojpuri, Hindi, Urdu, English
- Time zone: UTC+5:30 (IST)
- PIN: 841236
- Telephone code 06154: 841236

Hasanpura is a community development block and a town in district of Siwan, in Bihar state of India. It is one of 13 blocks of Siwan subdivision. The headquarters of the block is at Hasanpura town.

The total area of the block is 96.56 square kilometres (37.28 mi^{2}) and the total population of the block as of the 2011 census of India is 149,580.

The block is divided into many gram panchayats and villages.

== Gram panchayats ==
The following are the gram panchayats of Hasanpura block in Siwan subdivision, Siwan district.

- Aranda
- Gaighat
- Harpura Kotwa
- Hasanpura
- Laheji
- Mandrapali
- Pakari
- Phalpura
- Piyaur
- Pajanpura
- Pahuli
- Sheikhpura
- Telkathu
- Usari buzurg

== See also ==
- Administration in Bihar
