= Mukhi =

Government title in the Indian subcontinent

Mukhi (mukhia) is the title used for a head of community or village elites and their local government in Western India and Sindh. It is derived from the word mukhiya meaning 'foremost', and prior to Indian independence they were the most powerful person in each community, imbued with both civil and judicial powers.

== Status ==
Mukhi headmen generally came from the wealthiest or most prominent families within their community and acted as the presidents of the local panchayats. According to local traditions, the Mukhi could be a hereditary position inherited by the eldest son or an elected position, as were the panchayats. Decisions made by the panchayat were accepted by their communities and did not require enforcement. In developed areas, many also held high positions in business.

== History ==
The tradition of mukhis and panchayat raj (village self-government) is thought to be thousands of years old but currently decreasing in influence due to the growth of government and democratic decentralisation.

Since at least the 16th Century, the roles carried out by mukhis included those relating to local revenue gathering and expenditure, policing and justice. By the 19th, under the British rule of India, they became government appointed agents. They led local Panchayats and acted as local representative of the rulers.

In 1876, according to the Village Police Act, the mukhis were also given central roles in the criminal justice system and required to carry out surveillance about suspicious activities and reporting to district level officials. They had powers to resolve conflicts within their community, particularly those relating to marriages, and give consent over the building of properties and officiate over daily events or rituals.

In Hyderabad, Sindh the position was always held by a member of the Bhaibund community who presided over the collection of fines for the violation of duties and obligations.

== Ismailism ==
In the Ismaili Nizari tradition, the term is also used for the guardian of each Jama'at Khana where the Mukhi acts as the tangible symbol of the Imam's authority, by officiating over daily rituals.

== Family name ==
Mukhi is also a common name within Sindhis denoting a hereditary relationship to a mukhi and, from a separate root, in other Indian communities as meaning "beautiful".

== See also ==
- Faujdar
- Zamindar
- Village accountant
- Sarpanch
- Panchayati raj
- Local government in India

== Sources ==
- Bherumal Mahirchand Advani, "Amilan-jo-Ahwal" - published in Sindhi, 1919
- Amilan-jo-Ahwal (1919) - translated into English in 2016 ("A History of the Amils") at sindhis
