= Siwan, Bihar =

City in Bihar, India

Siwan
- City
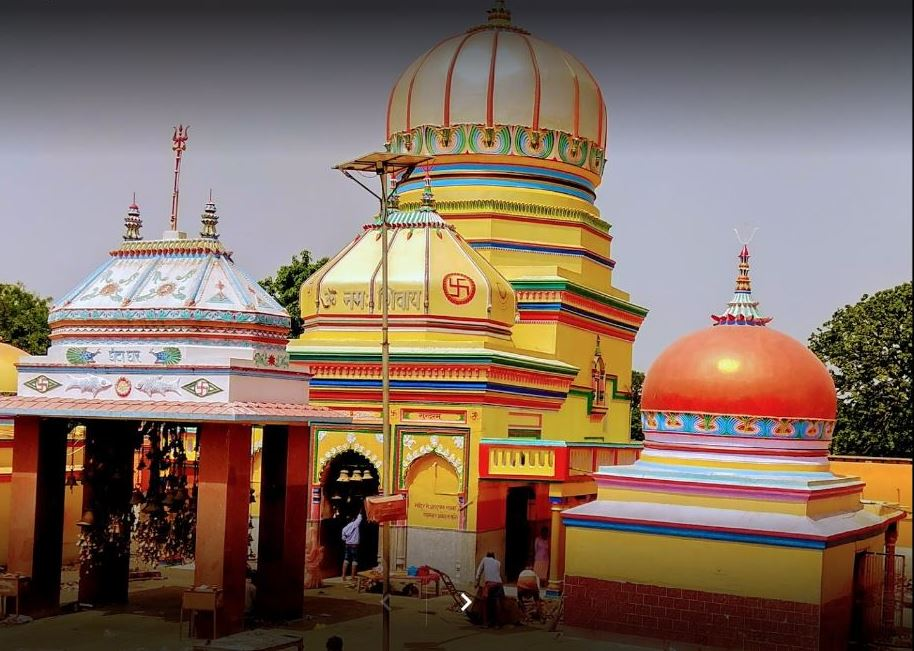
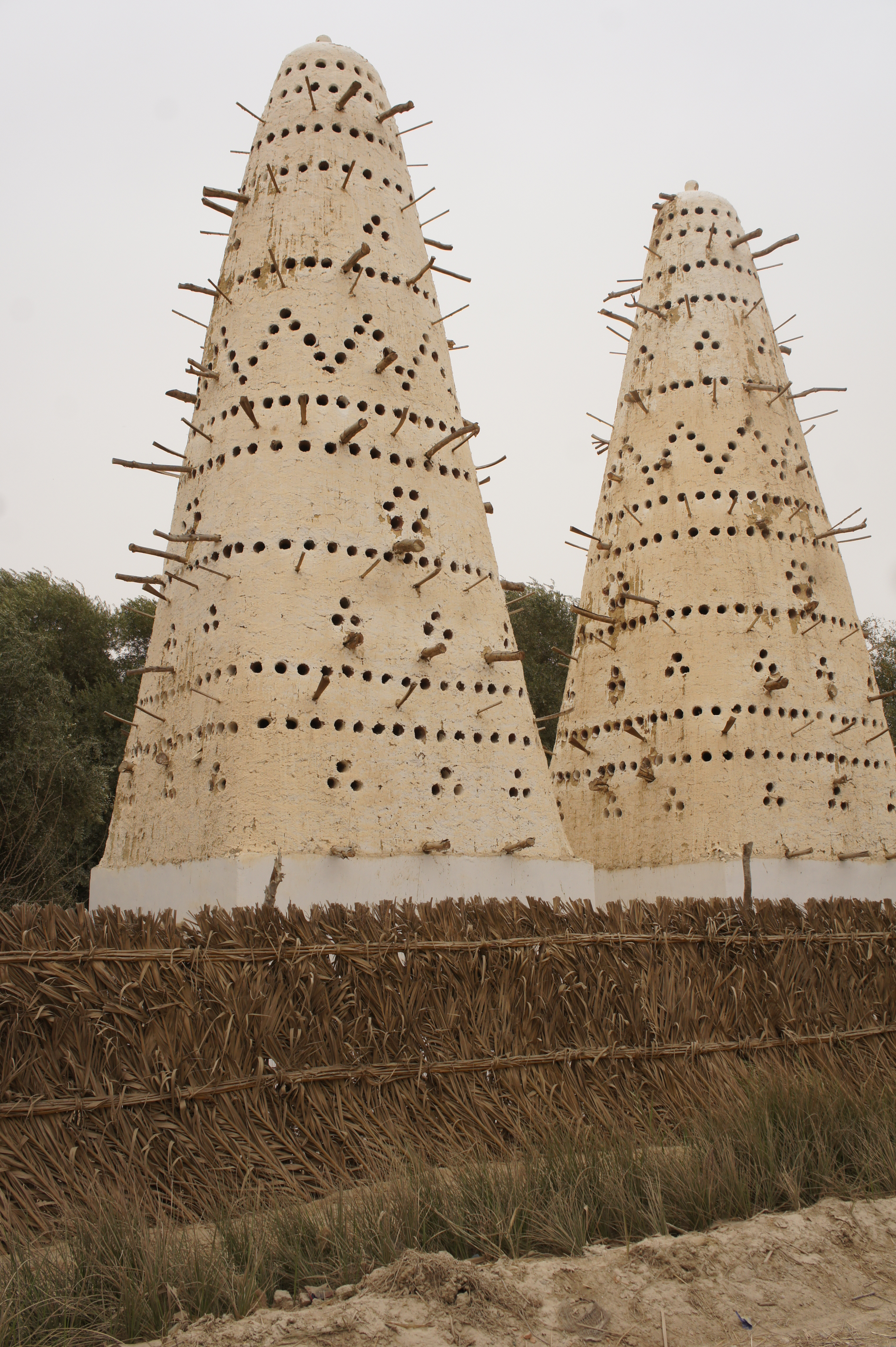
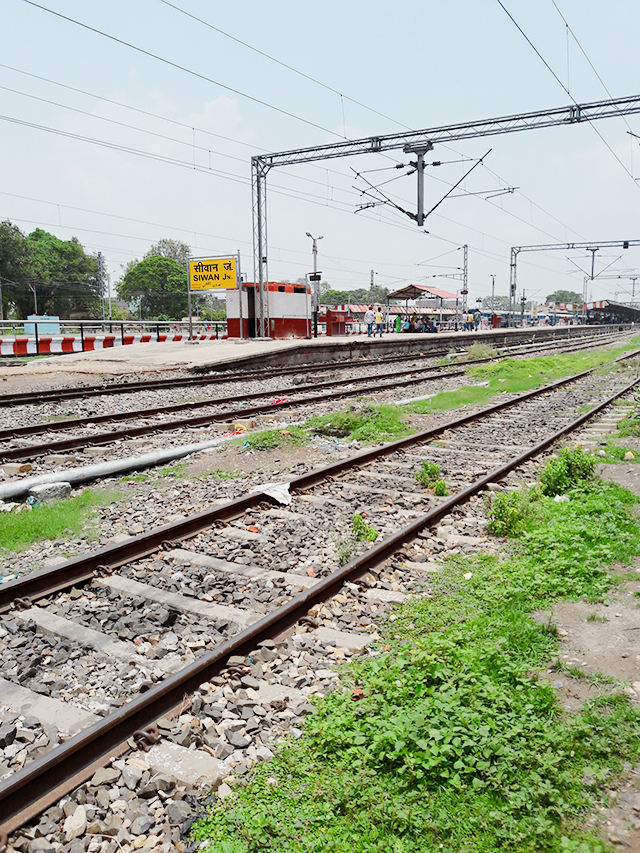

- Location in Bihar, India Siwan (India)
- Coordinates: 26.22°N 84.36°E
- Country: India
- State: Bihar
- Region: North Bihar
- District: Siwan
- Subdivision: Siwan Subdivision
- Block: Siwan Block
- Established: 1924

Government
  - Type: Council–manager
  - Body: Siwan Municipal Council
  - Chairperson: Sempi Devi (BJP)
  - Deputy chairman: Kavita Singh

Area
  - Total: 69.4 km^{2} (26.8 sq mi)
  - Rank: 53rd
- Elevation: 72 m (236 ft)

Population (2011)
  - Total: 135,066
  - Rank: 18th
  - Density: 1,950/km^{2} (5,040/sq mi)

Language
  - Official: Hindi
  - Additional official: Urdu
  - Regional: Bhojpuri
- Time zone: UTC+5:30 (IST)
- Pin Code: 841226-841227
- ISO 3166 code: IN-BR
- Vehicle registration: BR-29
- Climate: Cwa
- Lok Sabha constituency: Siwan
- Vidhan Sabha constituency: Siwan
- Website: siwan.nic.in

Siwan is a city and nagar parishad in the Indian state of Bihar. It is the administrative headquarters of Siwan district and one of the urban settlements out of three in the district. It is located close to Uttar Pradesh.

== History ==
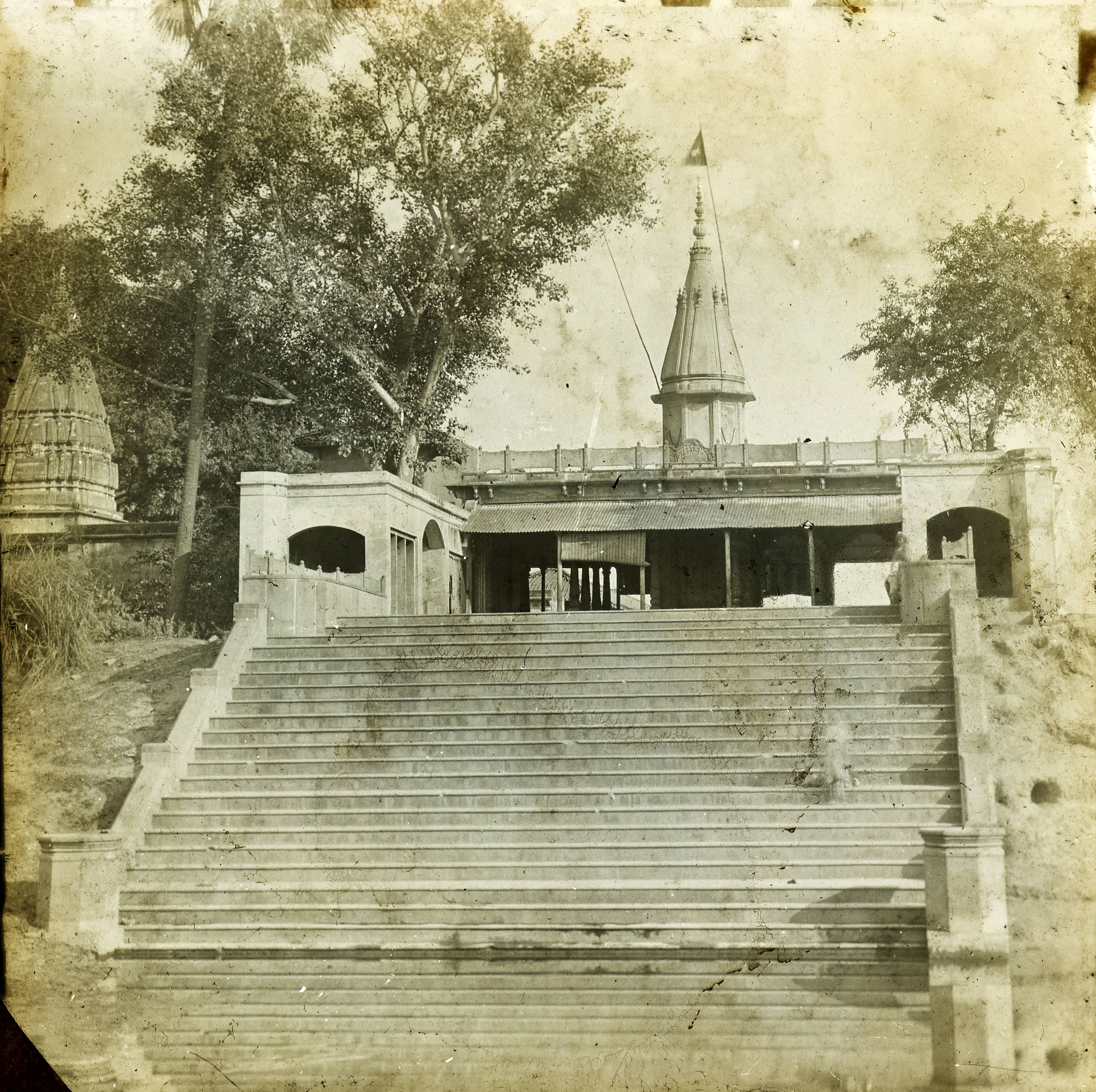
A bathing ghat in siwan, ca. 1906

The Siwan Municipal Council (SMC) was established in 1924. It was the subdivisional headquarters of Siwan subdivision under the old Saran district. It became district headquarters of the Siwan district when it was formed in 1972.

== Geography and climate ==
Siwan city is located at coordinates 26.22°N 84.36°E Latitude and longitude. It is counted in one of the tarai region of Himalaya Mountain range. It has an average elevation of 72 metres (236 ft). Daha River, which is a small river, which floods in rainy season pass through the west of the town. The river starts drying up during the summer. The green area in Siwan is about (21%) of its area.

The weather of Siwan is generally mild cool throughout the year and temperature falls down up to 4 °C in December and January but it is warm in May, June and July. This climate is considered to be Cwa according to the Köppen-Geiger climate classification. and is best suited for agriculture.

Climate data for Siwan (1982-2012)
Month	Jan	Feb	Mar	Apr	May	Jun	Jul	Aug	Sep	Oct	Nov	Dec	Year
Mean daily maximum °C (°F)	23.1 (73.6)	26.1 (79.0)	32.4 (90.3)	36.2 (97.2)	38.6 (101.5)	36.2 (97.2)	32.8 (91.0)	32.3 (90.1)	32.0 (89.6)	31.8 (89.2)	28.7 (83.7)	24.7 (76.5)	31.2 (88.2)
Daily mean °C (°F)	16.4 (61.5)	18.9 (66.0)	24.5 (76.1)	28.9 (84.0)	32.0 (89.6)	31.4 (88.5)	29.4 (84.9)	29.2 (84.6)	28.7 (83.7)	26.7 (80.1)	21.6 (70.9)	17.6 (63.7)	25.4 (77.8)
Mean daily minimum °C (°F)	9.8 (49.6)	11.8 (53.2)	16.7 (62.1)	21.7 (71.1)	25.5 (77.9)	26.6 (79.9)	26.0 (78.8)	26.2 (79.2)	25.5 (77.9)	21.7 (71.1)	14.5 (58.1)	10.5 (50.9)	19.7 (67.5)
Average precipitation mm (inches)	21 (0.8)	7 (0.3)	11 (0.4)	7 (0.3)	25 (1.0)	164 (6.5)	257 (10.1)	316 (12.4)	192 (7.6)	54 (2.1)	6 (0.2)	2 (0.1)	1,062 (41.8)
Source: Climate-data.org

== Demographics ==
As of 2011 Indian Census, Siwan had a total population of 135,066, of which 70,756 were males and 64,310 were females. Population within the age group of 0 to 6 years was 18,282. The total number of literates in Siwan was 92,967, which constituted 68.8% of the population with male literacy of 73.6% and female literacy of 63.6%. The effective literacy rate of 7+ population of Siwan was 79.6%, of which male literacy rate was 85.2% and female literacy rate was 73.5%. The Scheduled Castes and Scheduled Tribes population was 8,244 and 1,514 respectively. Siwan had 21223 households in 2011.

As of 2001 India census, Siwan had a population of 108,172 of which 57,223 were male and 50,949 female.

=== Religion ===
Majority of the people follow Hinduism (65%), followed by Islam (34%). Small populations of followers of Christianity, Sikhism, Buddhism and Jainism are also present in the city.

Religions in Siwan Nagar Parishad
Religion	Percent
Hindus	64.74%
Muslims	34.19%
Others	1.07%

== Transport ==
=== Roadways ===
NH-531 connects Siwan to Gopalganj and Chhapra. NH-531 meets to NH-27 at Gopalganj. Which is second longest road in India. Bihar State Highway-47 connects Barharia, Mairwa and Guthani to Siwan. State Highway-73 and 89 also connects Siwan to nearest town and villages. Ram janki marg NH-227A This four lane corridor connects ayodhya to janakpur passed through Siwan city.

=== Railways ===
There is Siwan Junction railway station in Siwan which well connects to major cities of India. It is a major junction of North Eastern Railway zone and falls under Varanasi division. Some important trains passing through this station are vaishali Express, Bihar Sampark Kranti Express, Arunachal AC Superfast Express, Amrapali Express and Avadh Assam Express. Some passenger trains originating from this station are Siwan-Samastipur, Siwan-Gorakhpur, Siwan-Thawe. In 2024-25, this station was ranked 5th among the top-earning railway stations of North Eastern Railway zone. Another railway station in the city is Siwan kachari Railway station situated in Siwan city which lies on the Siwan-Thawe Railway Section. all passenger train passing through this station stops here.

=== Airways ===
There is no airport in Siwan. Jay Prakash Narayan Airport which is situated 140 km away in Patna is the nearest airport. Gorakhpur Airport (100 km) and Kushinagar Airport (95 km) are other nearby airports.

== Education ==
List of educational institutions in Siwan district, Bihar.

- D.A.V. Post-Graduate College, Siwan
- Vidya Bhawan Mahila College
- Ram Vilas Ganga Ram College
- Government Engineering College, Siwan

== Notable people ==
- Khuda Bakhsh
- Manoj Bhawuk
- Mihir Diwakar
- Prabhavati Devi
- Satyendra Dubey
- Meeran Haider
- Ramesh Singh Kushwaha
- Noori Mian
- Akhilendra Mishra
- Natwarlal
- Mangal Pandey
- Nirupama Pandey
- Chandrashekhar Prasad
- Rajendra Prasad 1st President of India
- Sunil Prasad
- Syed Ali Akhtar Rizvi
- Osama Shahab
- Mohammad Shahabuddin
- Kaushalendra Pratap Shahi
- Jai Prakash Narayan Singh
- Ramdev Singh
- Shyam Bahadur Singh
- Vashishtha Narayan Singh
- Indradeep Sinha
- Kavita Singh, Indian politician
- Janardan Tiwari
- Raza Naqvi Wahi
- Khesari Lal Yadav
- Om Prakash Yadav
