= List of urban local bodies in Bihar =

Administrative Division in Details
- Divisions: 9
- Districts: 38
- Subdivisions: 101
- Blocks: 534
- Cities and towns: 264
- Municipal Corporations: 19
- Nagar Parishads: 90
- Nagar Panchayats: 157
- Panchayats: 8,406
- Villages: 45,103
- Police districts: 43
- Police stations: 853

Bihar is administratively divided into 9 divisions and 38 districts. For the administration of urban areas, three types of Urban Local Bodies (ULBs) has been constituted as per the provisions of 74th Constitutional Amendment Act,1992. As of 2026, Bihar has 264 ULBs consisting of 19 municipal corporations, 90 nagar parishads (city councils), and 157 nagar panchayats (town councils).

== Urban Local Governance ==
As per Census 2011, Bihar is the second least urbanised state in the country, with a rate of urbanisation of 11.3%, as compared to the national rate of 31.16%. The state has 139 StatutoryTowns and 60 Census Towns.

For the administration of the urban areas, Bihar has 19 municipal corporations, 88 nagar parishads (city councils), and 154 nagar panchayats (town councils). Bihar has one municipal act to establish and govern all municipalities in the state: Bihar Municipal Act, 2007.

As per a 2017 report by the Comptroller and Auditor General of India, Urban Local Bodies (ULBs) in Bihar carry out 12 out of 18 functions, and the remaining 6 are carried out by Bihar state government departments. The Fifth Bihar State Finance Commission report states that the ULB funds are ‘grossly inadequate for their assigned functions, they are unable to utilize even that’.

The Bihar Municipal Act, 2007 creates the following categories of urban areas based on their population. All three types of urban areas must have at least 75% of their population engaged in non-agricultural work.

Types of Urban Areas according to the Bihar Municipal Act, 2007
Type	Population Criteria	Type of Local Body
City	Larger urban area: 2 lakh or more	Municipal Corporation
Town	Medium urban area: 40 thousand or more but less than 2 lakh	Municipal Council
Small Town or Transitional Area	12 thousand and more but less than 40 thousand	Nagar Panchayat

Further, depending on the population size, the Act prescribes the minimum and maximum number of councillors/wards allowed within each type of local government.

Minimum and Maximum number of Councillors/Wards Allowed according to the Bihar Municipal Act, 2007
Population Range	Minimum	Incremental Number	Maximum
Municipal Corporations
Above 10 lakh	67	One additional Councillor for every 75,000 above 10 lakh	75
Above 5 lakh up to 10 lakh	57	One additional Councillor for every 50,000 above 5 lakh	67
Above 2 lakh up to 5 lakh	45	One additional Councillor for every 25,000 above 2 lakh	57
Municipal Council
Class 'A' Municipal Council	42	One additional Councillor for every 15,000 above 1,50,000	45
Class 'B' Municipal Council	37	One additional Councillor for every 10,000 above 1 lakh	42
Class 'C' Municipal Council	25	One additional Councillor for every 5,000 above 40, 000	37
Nagar Panchayat
Nagar Panchayat	10	One additional Member for every 2,000 above 12,000	25

The Act mentions the following key positions as well as committees for ULBs:

Elected Officials	Administrative Officials	Committees
Councillor, Chief Councillor, Deputy Chief Councillor	Municipal Commissioner, Controller of Municipal Finances and Accounts, Municipal Internal Auditor, Chief Municipal Engineer, Municipal Architect and Town Planner, Chief Municipal Health Officer, Municipal Law Officer, Municipal Secretary, three Additional Municipal commissioners Such number of Joint Municipal Commissioners or Deputy Municipal Commissioners or Deputy Chief Municipal Engineers as the Empowered Standing Committee may, from time to time, determine,	Empowered Standing Committee, Joint Committee, Municipal Accounts Committee, Subject Committee, Ward Committee, Wards Committee

=== Ward Committees ===
Bihar Municipal Act, 2007 mandates the establishment of Ward Committees through the Bihar Urban Local Body (Community Participation) Rules, 2013. Section 31 of the Bihar Municipal Act, 2007 mandates the establishment of Ward Committees for each ward of a municipality. The ward level elected councillor would be the chairperson of their respective Ward Committee. Up to 10 representatives from the civil society belonging to the ward would be nominated into the committee by the ULB.

Even though the creation of ward committees is mandated in municipalities, they have not been formed in Bihar.

== Municipal Corporations ==
There are 19 Municipal Corporations in Bihar.

#	Corporation Name	City	District	Area (km^{2})	Population (2011)	No. of Wards	Year Established	Last Election	Ruling Party	Website
1	Arrah Municipal Corporation	Arrah	Bhojpur	30.97	261,430	45	2007	2022		
2	Begusarai Municipal Corporation	Begusarai	Begusarai		252,008	45	2010	2022		
3	Bettiah Municipal Corporation	Bettiah	West Champaran	11.63	237,254	46	2020	2022		
4	Bhagalpur Municipal Corporation	Bhagalpur	Bhagalpur	30.17	400,146	51	1981	2022		
5	Bihar Sharif Municipal Corporation	Bihar Sharif	Nalanda	23.50	337,819	51	2007	2022		
6	Chhapra Municipal Corporation	Chhapra	Saran	16.96	202,352	45	2017	2022		
7	Darbhanga Municipal Corporation	Darbhanga	Darbhanga	19.18	296,039	48	1982	2022		
8	Gaya Municipal Corporation	Gaya	Gaya	50.17	474,093	53	1983	2022		
9	Katihar Municipal Corporation	Katihar	Katihar	33.46	240,838	45	2009	2022		
10	Madhubani Municipal Corporation	Madhubani, India	Madhubani	46.56	164,156	45	2020	2023		
11	Motihari Municipal Corporation	Motihari	East Champaran		222,646	46	2020	2022		
12	Munger Municipal Corporation	Munger	Munger		213,303	45	2009	2022		
13	Muzaffarpur Municipal Corporation	Muzaffarpur	Muzaffarpur	32.00	354,462	49	1981	2022		
14	Patna Municipal Corporation	Patna	Patna	108.87	1,684,222	75	1952	2022		
15	Purnia Municipal Corporation	Purnia	Purnia		282,248	46	2009	2022		
16	Saharsa Municipal Corporation	Saharsa	Saharsa		216,491	46	2021	2023		
17	Samastipur Municipal Corporation	Samastipur	Samastipur		253,136	47	2020	2022		
18	Sasaram Municipal Corporation	Sasaram	Rohtas		264,709	48	2020	2022		
19	Sitamarhi Municipal Corporation	Sitamarhi	Sitamarhi	66.19	67,818	46	2021	2022		

== Nagar Parishads ==
#	ULB Name	City	District	Area (km^{2})	Population (2011)	No. of Wards	Year Established	Last Election	Ruling Party	Remarks
1	Piro Nagar Parishad	Piro	Bhojpur		44,550	26		2022		Upgraded Nagar Parishad
2	Barh Nagar Parishad	Barh	Patna		61,470	27		2022		Old Nagar Parishad (Unchanged)
3	Khagaul Nagar Parishad	Khagaul	Patna		44,364	30		2022		Old Nagar Parishad (Unchanged)
4	Danapur Nizamat Nagar Parishad	Danapur	Patna		182,429	45		2022		Old Nagar Parishad (Unchanged)
5	Mokama Nagar Parishad	Mokama	Patna		60,678	28		2022		Old Nagar Parishad (Unchanged)
6	Phulwari Sharif Nagar Parishad	Phulwari Sharif	Patna		81,740	38		2022		Old Nagar Parishad (Unchanged)
7	Bakhtiyarpur Nagar Parishad	Bakhtiyarpur	Patna		47,897	27		2022		Old Nagar Parishad (Unchanged)
8	Fatuha Nagar Parishad	Fatuha	Patna		50,961	27		2022		Old Nagar Parishad (Unchanged)
9	Masaurhi Nagar Parishad	Masaurhi	Patna		83,477	34		2022		Area Extended Nagar Parishad
10	Bihta Nagar Parishad	Bihta	Patna		47,549	27		2022		New Nagar Parishad
11	Sampatchak Nagar Parishad	Sampatchak	Patna		69,079	31		2022		New Nagar Parishad
12	Maner Nagar Parishad	Maner	Patna		40,068	25		2022		Old Nagar Panchayat (Unchanged)
13	Barbigha Nagar Parishad	Barbigha	Sheikhpura		56,831	28		2022		Area Extended Nagar Parishad
14	Sheikhpura Nagar Parishad	Sheikhpura	Sheikhpura		62,927	33		2022		Area Extended Nagar Parishad
15	Hilsa Nagar Parishad	Hilsa	Nalanda		51,052	26		2022		Old Nagar Parishad (Unchanged)
16	Islampur Nagar Parishad	Islampur	Nalanda		43,211	26		2022		Upgraded Nagar Parishad
17	Rajgir Nagar Parishad	Rajgir	Nalanda		72,752	32		2022		Upgraded Nagar Parishad
18	Jamalpur Nagar Parishad	Jamalpur	Munger		105,434	36		2022		Old Nagar Parishad (Unchanged)
19	Haveli Kharagpur Nagar Parishad	Haveli Kharagpur	Munger		40,765	25		2022		Upgraded Nagar Parishad
20	Lakhisarai Nagar Parishad	Lakhisarai	Lakhisarai		99,979	33		2022		Old Nagar Parishad (Unchanged)
21	Surajgarha Nagar Parishad	Surajgarha	Lakhisarai		43,108	26		2022		New Nagar Parishad
22	Barahiya Nagar Parishad	Barahiya	Lakhisarai		43,032	26		2022		Old Nagar Panchayat (Unchanged)
23	Nawada Nagar Parishad	Nawada	Nawada		81,458	44		2022		Area Extended Nagar Parishad
24	Warisaliganj Nagar Parishad	Warisaliganj	Nawada		41,315	25		2022		Upgraded Nagar Parishad
25	Hisua Nagar Parishad	Hisua	Nawada		50,791	27		2022		Upgraded Nagar Parishad
26	Bodh Gaya Nagar Parishad	Bodh Gaya	Gaya		78,607	33		2022		Upgraded Nagar Parishad
27	Sherghati Nagar Parishad	Sherghati	Gaya		52,541	28		2022		Upgraded Nagar Parishad
28	Tekari Nagar Parishad	Tekari	Gaya		43,214	26		2022		Upgraded Nagar Parishad
29	Aurangabad Nagar Parishad	Aurangabad	Aurangabad		102,244	33		2022		Old Nagar Parishad (Unchanged)
30	Daudnagar Nagar Parishad	Daudnagar	Aurangabad		52,364	27		2022		Old Nagar Parishad (Unchanged
31	Jehanabad Nagar Parishad	Jehanabad	Jehanabad		103,202	33		2022		Old Nagar Parishad (Unchanged
32	Arwal Nagar Parishad	Arwal	Arwal		51,849	25		2022		Old Nagar Parishad (Unchanged
33	Jamui Nagar Parishad	Jamui	Jamui		87,357	30		2022		Old Nagar Parishad (Unchanged)
34	Jhajha Nagar Parishad	Jhajha	Jamui		40,646	25		2022		Old Nagar Panchayat (Unchanged)
35	Buxar Nagar Parishad	Buxar	Buxar		145,521	42		2022		Area Extended Nagar Parishad
36	Dumraon Nagar Parishad	Dumraon	Buxar		90,452	35		2022		Area Extended Nagar Parishad
37	Bhabhua Nagar Parishad	Bhabhua	Kaimur		50,179	25		2022		Old Nagar Parishad (Unchanged)
38	Dehri-Dalmianagar Nagar Parishad	Dehri Dalmianagar	Rohtas		137,231	39		2022		Old Nagar Parishad (Unchanged)
39	Bikramganj Nagar Parishad	Bikramganj	Rohtas		48,465	27		2022		Old Nagar Parishad (Unchanged)
40	Nokha Nagar Parishad	Nokha	Rohtas		40,120	25		2022		Upgraded Nagar Parishad
41	Kanti Nagar Parishad	Kanti	Muzaffarpur		43,799	26		2022		Upgraded Nagar Parishad
42	Motipur Nagar Parishad	Motipur	Muzaffarpur		43,708	26		2022		Upgraded Nagar Parishad
43	Sahebganj Nagar Parishad	Sahebganj	Muzaffarpur		44,576	26		2022		Upgraded Nagar Parishad
44	Janakpur Road Nagar Parishad	Janakpur Road	Sitamarhi		41,365	25		2022		Upgraded Nagar Parishad
45	Bairgania Nagar Parishad	Bairgania	Sitamarhi		42,895	26		2022		Upgraded Nagar Parishad
46	Sheohar Nagar Parishad	Sheohar	Sheohar		45,312	26		2022		Upgraded Nagar Parishad
47	Raxaul Nagar Parishad	Raxaul	East Champaran		55,536	25		2022		Old Nagar Parishad (Unchanged)
48	Mehsi Nagar Parishad	Mehsi	East Champaran		52,312	25		2026		Old Nagar Panchayat (Unchanged)
49	Dhaka Nagar Parishad	Dhaka	East Champaran		42,063	25		2022		Old Nagar Parishad (Unchanged)
50	Chakia Nagar Parishad	Chakia	East Champaran		20,548	25		2022		Upgraded Nagar Parishad
51	Bagaha Nagar Parishad	Bagaha	West Champaran		112,634	35		2022		Old Nagar Parishad (Unchanged)
52	Narkatiaganj Nagar Parishad	Narkatiaganj	West Champaran		49,507	25		2022		Old Nagar Parishad (Unchanged)
53	Ramnagar Nagar Parishad	Ramnagar	West Champaran		48,411	27		2022		Upgraded Nagar Parishad
54	Hajipur Nagar Parishad	Hajipur	Vaishali		191,275	45		2022		Area Extended Nagar Parishad
55	Mahnar Nagar Parishad	Mahnar	Vaishali		48,293	27		2022		Old Nagar Parishad (Unchanged)
56	Lalganj Nagar Parishad	Lalganj	Vaishali		43,954	26		2022		Upgraded Nagar Parishad
57	Mahua Nagar Parishad	Mahua	Vaishali		40,385	25		2022		Upgraded Nagar Parishad
58	Khagaria Nagar Parishad	Khagaria	Khagaria		119,841	39		2022		Area Extended Nagar Parishad
59	Gogri Jamalpur Nagar Parishad	Gogri Jamalpur	Khagaria		96,378	36		2022		Upgraded Nagar Parishad
60	Kasba Nagar Parishad	Kasba	Purnia		43,059	26		2022		Upgraded Nagar Parishad
61	Banmankhi Nagar Parishad	Banmankhi	Purnia		44,218	26		2022		Upgraded Nagar Parishad
62	Araria Nagar Parishad	Araria	Araria		79,021	29		2022		Old Nagar Parishad (Unchanged)
63	Forbesganj Nagar Parishad	Forbesganj	Araria		50,475	25		2022		Old Nagar Parishad (Unchanged)
64	Jogbani Nagar Parishad	Jogbani	Araria		54,455	28		2022		Upgraded Nagar Parishad
65	Kishanganj Nagar Parishad	Kishanganj	Kishanganj		105,782	34		2022		Old Nagar Parishad (Unchanged)
66	Siwan Nagar Parishad	Siwan	Siwan		191,385	45		2022		Area Extended Nagar Parishad
67	Gopalganj Nagar Parishad	Gopalganj	Gopalganj		67,339	28		2022		Old Nagar Parishad (Unchanged)
68	Barauli Nagar Parishad	Barauli	Gopalganj		41,877	25		2022		Upgraded Nagar Parishad
69	Mirganj Nagar Parishad	Mirganj	Gopalganj		42,713	26		2022		Upgraded Nagar Parishad
70	Benipur Nagar Parishad	Benipur	Darbhanga		75,317	29		2022		Old Nagar Parishad (Unchanged)
71	Jale Nagar Parishad	Jale	Darbhanga		44,444	25		2022		Upgraded Nagar Parishad
72	Jhanjharpur Nagar Parishad	Jhanjharpur	Madhubani		49,896	27		2022		Upgraded Nagar Parishad
73	Rosera Nagar Parishad	Rosera	Samastipur		46,074	26		2022		Upgraded Nagar Parishad
74	Dalsinghsarai Nagar Parishad	Dalsinghsarai	Samastipur		55,562	28		2022		Upgraded Nagar Parishad
75	Tajpur Nagar Parishad	Tajpur	Samastipur		47,503	27		2022		New Nagar Parishad
76	Shahpur Patori Nagar Parishad	Shahpur Patori	Samastipur		45,858	26		2022		New Nagar Parishad
77	Bihat Nagar Parishad	Bihat	Begusarai		100,038	37		2022		Area Extended Nagar Parishad
78	Teghra Nagar Parishad	Teghra	Begusarai		56,234	28		2022		Upgraded Nagar Parishad
79	Ballia Nagar Parishad	Ballia	Begusarai		56,400	28		2022		Upgraded Nagar Parishad
80	Bakhri Nagar Parishad	Bakhri	Begusarai		48,855	27		2022		Upgraded Nagar Parishad
81	Barauni Nagar Parishad	Barauni	Begusarai		72,262	31		2022		New Nagar Parishad
82	Sultanganj Nagar Parishad	Sultanganj	Bhagalpur		57,358	28		2022		Area Extended Nagar Parishad
83	Naugachhia Nagar Parishad	Naugachhia	Bhagalpur		53,723	28		2022		Upgraded Nagar Parishad
84	Banka Nagar Parishad	Banka	Banka		45,977	26		2022		Old Nagar Parishad (Unchanged)
85	Simri Bakhtiyarpur Nagar Parishad	Simri Bakhtiyarpur	Saharsa		54,680	28		2022		Upgraded Nagar Parishad
86	Supaul Nagar Parishad	Supaul	Supaul		65,437	28		2022		Old Nagar Parishad (Unchanged)
87	Triveniganj Nagar Parishad	Triveniganj	Supaul		50,053	27		2022		New Nagar Parishad
88	Madhepura Nagar Parishad	Madhepura	Madhepura		54,472	26		2022		Old Nagar Parishad (Unchanged)
89	Udakishunganj Nagar Parishad	Udakishunganj	Madhepura		46,861	26		2022		New Nagar Parishad
90	Sonpur Nagar Parishad	Sonpur	Saran		37,776	25		2022		Old Nagar Panchayat (Unchanged)

== Nagar Panchayats ==
#	ULB Name	City	District	Area (km^{2})	Population (2011)	No. of Wards	Year Established	Last Election	Ruling Party	Remarks
1	Bihiya Nagar Panchayat	Bihiya	Bhojpur		26,707	14		2022		Old Nagar Panchayat (Unchanged)
2	Jagdishpur Nagar Panchayat	Jagdishpur	Bhojpur		32,447	18		2022		Old Nagar Panchayat (Unchanged)
3	Koilwar Nagar Panchayat	Koilwar	Bhojpur		17,725	14		2022		Old Nagar Panchayat (Unchanged)
4	Shahpur Nagar Panchayat	Shahpur	Bhojpur		17,767	11		2022		Old Nagar Panchayat (Unchanged)
5	Garhani Nagar Panchayat	Garhani	Bhojpur		15,198	12		2022		New
6	Khusrupur Nagar Panchayat	Khusrupur	Patna		15,731	10		2022		Old Nagar Panchayat (Unchanged)
7	Bikram Nagar Panchayat	Bikram	Patna		22,486	14		2022		Old Nagar Panchayat (Unchanged)
8	Naubatpur Nagar Panchayat	Naubatpur	Patna		25,011	15		2022		Old Nagar Panchayat (Unchanged)
9	Punpun Nagar Panchayat	Punpun	Patna		12,907	11		2022		New
10	Paliganj Nagar Panchayat	Paliganj	Patna		32,035	20		2022		New
11	Chewara Nagar Panchayat	Chewara	Sheikhpura		12,303	10		2022		New
12	Shekhopur Sarai Nagar Panchayat	Shekhopursarai	Sheikhpura		22,748	15		2022		New
13	Silao Nagar Panchayat	Silao	Nalanda		25,674	14		2022		Old Nagar Panchayat (Unchanged)
14	Harnaut Nagar Panchayat	Harnaut	Nalanda		30,725	19		2022		New
15	Sarmera Nagar Panchayat	Sarmera	Nalanda		12,551	10		2022		New
16	Rahui Nagar Panchayat	Rahui	Nalanda		12,703	10		2022		New
17	Chandi Nagar Panchayat	Chandi	Nalanda		14,235	11		2022		New
18	Asthawan Nagar Panchayat	Asthawan	Nalanda		14,061	11		2022		New
19	Parwalpur Nagar Panchayat	Parwalpur	Nalanda		13,432	11		2022		New
20	Giriyak Nagar Panchayat	Giriyak	Nalanda		15,825	12		2022		New
21	Ekangsarai Nagar Panchayat	Ekangsarai	Nalanda		23,010	16		2022		New
22	Nalanda Nagar Panchayat	Nalanda	Nalanda		26,484	17		2022		New
23	Pawapuri Nagar Panchayat	Pawapuri	Nalanda		13,241	11		2022		New
24	Rajauli Nagar Panchayat	Rajauli	Nawada		20,336	14		2022		New
25	Wazirganj Nagar Panchayat	Wazirganj	Gaya		22,197	15		2022		New
26	Fatehpur Nagar Panchayat	Fatehpur	Gaya		13,658	11		2022		New
27	Dobhi Nagar Panchayat	Dobhi	Gaya		14,427	11		2022		New
28	Imamganj Nagar Panchayat	Imamganj	Gaya		22,421	15		2022		New
29	Khizersarai Nagar Panchayat	Khizersarai	Gaya		18,008	13		2022		New
30	Chausa Nagar Panchayat	Chausa	Buxar		20,987	14		2022		New
31	Brahmpur Nagar Panchayat	Brahmpur	Buxar		17,057	13		2022		New
32	Itarhi Nagar Panchayat	Itarhi	Buxar		14,155	11		2022		New
33	Mohania Nagar Panchayat	Mohania	Kaimur		31,609	16		2022		Old Nagar Panchayat (Unchanged)
34	Hata Nagar Panchayat	Hata	Kaimur		14,915	11		2022		New
35	Kudra Nagar Panchayat	Kudra	Kaimur		21,808	15		2022		New
36	Ramgarh Nagar Panchayat	Ramgarh	Kaimur		18,152	13		2022		New
37	Koath Nagar Panchayat	Koath	Rohtas		18,890	12		2022		Old Nagar Panchayat (Unchanged)
38	Nasriganj Nagar Panchayat	Nasriganj	Rohtas		23,819	14		2022		Old Nagar Panchayat (Unchanged)
39	Kochas Nagar Panchayat	Kochas	Rohtas		24,795	16		2022		Old Nagar Panchayat (Unchanged)
40	Chenari Nagar Panchayat	Chenari	Rohtas		19,596	14		2022		New
41	Dinara Nagar Panchayat	Dinara	Rohtas		14,579	11		2022		New
42	Kārākāt Nagar Panchayat	Kārākāt	Rohtas		15,774	12		2022		New
43	Rohtas Nagar Panchayat	Rohtas	Rohtas		18,787	13		2022		New
44	Muraul Nagar Panchayat	Muraul	Muzaffarpur		12,585	10		2022		New
45	Sakra Nagar Panchayat	Sakra	Muzaffarpur		14,071	11		2022		New
46	Baruraj Nagar Panchayat	Baruraj	Muzaffarpur		27,064	18		2022		New
47	Minapur Nagar Panchayat	Minapur	Muzaffarpur		27,382	18		2022		New
48	Turki-Kurhani Nagar Panchayat	Turki-Kurhani	Muzaffarpur		13,544	11		2022		New
49	Saraiya Nagar Panchayat	Saraiya	Muzaffarpur		16,336	12		2022		New
50	Madhopur Susta Nagar Panchayat	Madhopur Susta	Muzaffarpur		12,827	10		2022		New
51	Belsand Nagar Panchayat	Belsand	Sitamarhi		20,566	13		2022		Old Nagar Panchayat (Unchanged)
52	Sursand Nagar Panchayat	Sursand	Sitamarhi		29,688	19		2022		Old Nagar Panchayat (Unchanged)
53	Sugauli Nagar Panchayat	Sugauli	East Champaran		38,815	20		2022		Old Nagar Panchayat (Unchanged)
54	Areraj Nagar Panchayat	Areraj	East Champaran		26,014	14		2022		Old Nagar Panchayat (Unchanged
55	Kesaria Nagar Panchayat	Kesaria	East Champaran		18,984	11		2022		New
56	Pakari Dayal Nagar Panchayat	Pakri Dayal	East Champaran		29,582	15		2022		Old Nagar Panchayat (Unchanged)
57	Salemppur Nagar Panchayat	Salemppur, East Champaran	East Champaran			16		2022		Old Nagar Panchayat (Unchanged)
58	Madhuban Nagar Panchayat	Madhuban	East Champaran			12		2022		New
59	Chanpatia Nagar Panchayat	Chanpatia	West Champaran		27,095	15		2022		Old Nagar Panchayat (Unchanged)
60	Lauria Nagar Panchayat	Lauria	West Champaran		20,489	14		2022		New
61	Macchargawan (Yogapatti) Nagar Panchayat	Macchargawan	West Champaran		18,565	15		2022		New
62	Jandaha Nagar Panchayat	Jandaha	Vaishali		19,488	14		2022		New
63	Goraul Nagar Panchayat	Goraul	Vaishali		20,267	14		2022		New
64	Patepur Nagar Panchayat	Patepur	Vaishali		20,058	14		2022		New
65	Tarapur Nagar Panchayat	Tarapur	Munger		25,715	17		2022		New
66	Asarganj Nagar Panchayat	Asarganj	Munger		13,544	12		2022		New
67	Sangrampur Nagar Panchayat	Sangrampur	Munger		16,292	12		2022		New
68	Alauli Nagar Panchayat	Alauli	Khagaria		15,525	12		2022		New
69	Parbatta Nagar Panchayat	Parbatta	Khagaria		33,596	21		2022		New
70	Mansi Nagar Panchayat	Mansi	Khagaria		27,606	18		2022		New
71	Beldaur Nagar Panchayat	Beldaur	Khagaria		20,703	14		2022		New
72	Rafiganj Nagar Panchayat	Rafiganj	Aurangabad		35,536	16		2022		Old Nagar Panchayat (Unchanged)
73	Nabinagar Nagar Panchayat	Nabinagar	Aurangabad		23,984	14		2022		Old Nagar Panchayat (Unchanged)
74	Barun Nagar Panchayat	Barun	Aurangabad		13,852	11		2022		New
75	Deo Nagar Panchayat	Deo	Aurangabad		13,162	11		2022		New
76	Jamhore Nagar Panchayat	Jamhore	Aurangabad			11		2022		New
77	Madanpur Nagar Panchayat	Madanpur	Aurangabad			10		2022		New
78	Makhdumpur Nagar Panchayat	Makhdumpur	Jehanabad		31,994	19		2022		Old Nagar Panchayat (Unchanged)
79	Ghosi Nagar Panchayat	Ghosi	Jehanabad		31,395	20		2022		New
80	Kako Nagar Panchayat	Kako	Jehanabad		23,037	16		2022		New
81	Kurtha Nagar Panchayat	Kurtha	Arwal		12,805	10		2022		New
82	Champanagar Nagar Panchayat	Champanagar	Purnia		17,605	13		2022		New
83	Baisi Nagar Panchayat	Baisi	Purnia		12,974	10		2022		New
84	Amour Nagar Panchayat	Amour	Purnia		15,310	12		2022		New
85	Jankinagar Nagar Panchayat	Jankinagar	Purnia		21,883	15		2022		New
86	Dhamdaha Nagar Panchayat	Dhamdaha	Purnia		37,987	23		2022		New
87	Mirganj Nagar Panchayat	Mirganj	Purnia		26,095	17		2022		New
88	Bhawanipur Nagar Panchayat	Bhawanipur	Purnia		23,378	16		2022		New
89	Rupauli Nagar Panchayat	Rupauli	Purnia		23,454	16		2022		New
90	Manihari Nagar Panchayat	Manihari	Katihar		26,629	15		2022		Old Nagar Panchayat (Unchanged)
91	Barsoi Nagar Panchayat	Barsoi	Katihar		26,985	17		2022		Old Nagar Panchayat (Unchanged)
92	Korha Nagar Panchayat	Korha	Katihar		14,113	11		2022		New
93	Barari Nagar Panchayat	Barari	Katihar		14,986	11		2022		New
94	Kursela Nagar Panchayat	Kursela	Katihar		17,208	13		2022		New
95	Amdabad Nagar Panchayat	Amdabad	Katihar		24,655	16		2022		New
96	Balrampur Nagar Panchayat	Balrampur	Katihar		12,164	10		2022		New
97	Raniganj Nagar Panchayat	Raniganj	Araria		28,037	18		2022		New
98	Jokihat Nagar Panchayat	Jokihat	Araria		15,790	12		2022		New
99	Narpatganj Nagar Panchayat	Narpatganj	Araria		32,941	20		2022		New
100	Bahadurganj Nagar Panchayat	Bahadurganj	Kishanganj		36,993	18		2022		Old Nagar Panchayat (Unchanged)
101	Thakurganj Nagar Panchayat	Thakurganj	Kishanganj		18,348	12		2022		Old Nagar Panchayat (Unchanged)
102	Pawaakhali Nagar Panchayat	Pawaakhali	Kishanganj		13,350	11		2022		New
103	Maharajganj Nagar Panchayat	Maharajganj	Siwan		24,282	17		2022		Old Nagar Panchayat (Unchanged)
104	Mairwa Nagar Panchayat	Mairwa	Siwan		23,565	13		2022		Old Nagar Panchayat (Unchanged)
105	Basantpur Nagar Panchayat	Basantpur	Siwan		13,293	11		2022		New
106	Guthani Nagar Panchayat	Guthani	Siwan		21,876	15		2022		New
107	Andar Nagar Panchayat	Andar	Siwan		14,824	11		2022		New
108	Gopalpur Nagar Panchayat	Gopalpur	Siwan		12,766	10		2022		New
109	Hasanpura Nagar Panchayat	Hasanpura	Siwan		30,304	19		2022		New
110	Barharia Nagar Panchayat	Barharia	Siwan		18,665	13		2022		New
111	Dighwara Nagar Panchayat	Dighwara	Saran		32,741	18		2022		Old Nagar Panchayat (Unchanged)
112	Marhaura Nagar Panchayat	Marhaura	Saran		29,932	16		2022		Old Nagar Panchayat (Unchanged)
113	Revelganj Nagar Panchayat	Revelganj	Saran		39,039	21		2022		Old Nagar Panchayat (Unchanged)
114	Ekma Bazar Nagar Panchayat	Ekma	Saran		34,390	19		2022		Old Nagar Panchayat (Unchanged)
115	Parsa Bazar Nagar Panchayat	Parsa	Saran		44,768	22		2022		Old Nagar Panchayat (Unchanged)
116	Mashrakh Nagar Panchayat	Mashrakh	Saran		24,197	16		2022		New
117	Manjhi Nagar Panchayat	Manjhi	Saran		21,081	15		2022		New
118	Kopa Nagar Panchayat	Kopa	Saran		18,779	13		2022		New
119	Kataiya Nagar Panchayat	Kataiya	Gopalganj		20,193	13		2022		Old Nagar Panchayat (Unchanged)
120	Hathua Nagar Panchayat	Hathua	Gopalganj		35,906	22		2022		New
121	Kusheshwar Asthan East Nagar Panchayat	Kusheshwar Asthan	Darbhanga		17,285	13		2022		New
122	Baheri Nagar Panchayat	Baheri	Darbhanga		21,872	15		2022		New
123	Hayaghat Nagar Panchayat	Hayaghat	Darbhanga		26,767	17		2022		New
124	Ghanshyampur Nagar Panchayat	Ghanshyampur	Darbhanga		20,005	14		2022		New
125	Biraul Nagar Panchayat	Biraul	Darbhanga		14,595	11		2022		New
126	Bharwara Nagar Panchayat	Bharwara	Darbhanga		12,619	10		2022		New
127	Singhwara Nagar Panchayat	Singhwara	Darbhanga		12,059	10		2022		New
128	Kamtaul-Ahiyari Nagar Panchayat	Kamtaul-Ahiyari	Darbhanga		13,955	11		2022		New
129	Jainagar Nagar Panchayat	Jainagar	Madhubani		21,782	14		2022		Old Nagar Panchayat (Unchanged)
130	Ghoghardiha Nagar Panchayat	Ghoghardiha	Madhubani		18,257	11		2022		Old Nagar Panchayat (Unchanged)
131	Phulparas Nagar Panchayat	Phulparas	Madhubani		22,833	15		2022		New
132	Benipatti Nagar Panchayat	Benipatti	Madhubani		35,674	22		2022		New
133	Sarairanjan Nagar Panchayat	Sarairanjan	Samastipur		37,768	23		2022		New
134	Musrigharari Nagar Panchayat	Musrigharari	Samastipur		31,653	20		2022		New
135	Singhia Nagar Panchayat	Singhia	Samastipur		31,952	20		2022		New
136	Kahalgaon Nagar Panchayat	Kahalgaon	Bhagalpur		33,700	17		2022		Old Nagar Panchayat (Unchanged)
137	Habibpur Nagar Panchayat	Habibpur	Bhagalpur		12,063	10		2022		New
138	Sabour Nagar Panchayat	Sabour	Bhagalpur		12,575	10		2022		New
139	Pirpainti Nagar Panchayat	Pirpainti	Bhagalpur		14,722	11		2022		New
140	Akbarnagar Nagar Panchayat	Akbarnagar	Bhagalpur		13,628	11		2022		New
141	Amarpur Nagar Panchayat	Amarpur	Banka		25,336	14		2022		Old Nagar Panchayat (Unchanged)
142	Katoria Nagar Panchayat	Katoria	Banka		21,787	15		2022		New
143	Bounsi Nagar Panchayat	Bounsi	Banka		34,803	21		2022		New
144	Saur Bazar Nagar Panchayat	Saur Bazar	Saharsa		15,737	12		2022		New
145	Bangaon Nagar Panchayat	Bangaon	Saharsa		30,061	19		2022		New
146	Nauhatta Nagar Panchayat	Nauhatta	Saharsa		27,386	18		2022		New
147	Sonbarsa Nagar Panchayat	Sonbarsa	Saharsa		23,852	16		2022		New
148	Birpur Nagar Panchayat	Birpur	Supaul		19,932	13		2022		Old Nagar Panchayat (Unchanged)
149	Nirmali Nagar Panchayat	Nirmali	Supaul		20,189	12		2022		Old Nagar Panchayat (Unchanged)
150	Pipra Nagar Panchayat	Pipra	Supaul		13,537	11		2022		New
151	Simrahi Nagar Panchayat	Simrahi	Supaul		25,671	17		2022		New
152	Murliganj Nagar Panchayat	Murliganj	Madhepura		28,691	15		2022		Old Nagar Panchayat (Unchanged)
153	Singheshwar Nagar Panchayat	Singheshwar	Madhepura		15,138	12		2022		New
154	Bihariganj Nagar Panchayat	Bihariganj	Madhepura		20,922	14		2022		New
155	Alamnagar Nagar Panchayat	Alamnagar	Madhepura		34,702	21		2022		New
156	Sikandra Nagar Panchayat	Sikandra	Jamui		16,879	12		2022		New

== Urban agglomerations ==
In the census of India 2011, an urban agglomeration is defined as follows:

"An urban agglomeration is a continuous urban spread constituting a town and its adjoining outgrowths (OGs), or two or more physically contiguous towns together with or without outgrowths of such towns. An Urban Agglomeration must consist of at least a statutory town and its total population (i.e. all the constituents put together) should not be less than 20,000 as per the 2001 Census. In varying local conditions, there were similar other combinations which have been treated as urban agglomerations satisfying the basic condition of contiguity."

=== Constituents of urban agglomerations in Bihar ===
The constituents of urban agglomerations in Bihar, with a population of 100,000 or above, are noted below:

- Patna Urban Agglomeration includes Patna (M Corp.), Badalpura (OG), Pataliputra Housing Colony (CT), Phulwari Sharif (NP), Nohsa (CT), Danapur (NP), Dinapur Cantonment (CB), Khagaul (NP) and Saidpura (CT).
- Gaya Urban Agglomeration includes Gaya (M Corp.), Kaler (OG) and Paharpur (CT).
- Bhagalpur Urban Agglomeration includes Bhagalpur (M Corp.),Habibpur (NP),sabour (NP) and Nathnagar (CT)
- Muzaffarpur Urban Agglomeration includes Muzaffarpur (M Corp.), Damodarpur (CT), Dumari urf Damodarpur Shahjahan (CT), Majhauli Khetal (CT), Yehiapur (CT) and Shekhpura (CT).
- Purnia Urban Agglomeration includes Purnia (M Corp.) and Kasba (NP).
- Darbhanga Urban Agglomeration includes Darbhanga (M Corp.), Padri (CT) and Bahadurpur (CT).
- Katihar Urban Agglomeration includes Katihar (M Corp.+OG) and Katihar Railway Colony (OG).
- Chapra Urban Agglomeration includes Chapra (M Corp.) and Sanrha (CT).
- Bettiah Urban Agglomeration includes Bettiah (M Corp.), Tola Mansaraut (CT), Kargahia Purab (CT) and Hat Saraiya (CT).
- Nawada Urban Agglomeration includes Nawada (NP) and Bhadauni (CT).
- Buxar Urban Agglomeration includes Buxar (NP) and Sarimpur (CT).
- Sitamarhi Urban Agglomeration includes Sitamarhi (NP), Rajopatti urf Kota Bazar (CT), Talkhapur Dumra (CT) and Dumra (NP).

Abbreviations: M Corp. = Municipal corporation, NP = Nagar panchayat, CT = Census town, OG= Out growth, CB = Cantonment board

=== Urban agglomeration constituents ===
Urban agglomerations constituents with a population above 100,000 as per 2011 census are shown in the table below.

Urban agglomeration constituents
Urban agglomeration	Name of constituent	District	Type	Population 2011	Male	Female	Population (0-6 years)	Literacy rate
Patna	Patna Municipal Corporation	Patna district	M Corp.	1,683,200	894,158	789,042	190,496	84.71
Munger	Munger	Munger district	M Corp.	3,88,000	2,00,000	1,88,000	42,260	81.83
Gaya	Gaya	Gaya district	M Corp.	463,454	245,764	217,690	59,015	85.74
Bhagalpur	Bhagalpur	Bhagalpur district	M Corp.	398,138	212,005	186,113	53,775	81.16
Muzaffarpur	Muzaffarpur	Muzaffarpur district	M Corp.	351,838	186,145	165,693	42,276	85.16
Darbhanga	Darbhanga	Darbhanga district	M Corp.	294,116	154,970	139,146	40,392	80.88
Purnia	Purnia	Purnia district	M Corp.	280,547	148,021	132,526	41,046	74.48
Katihar	Katihar	Katihar district	M Corp.	225,982	119,142	106,840	31,036	79.87
Sasaram	Rohtas	Rohtas district	M Corp.	222,597	106,250	95,347	27,668	89.30
Bettiah	Bettiah	West Champaran district	M Corp.	132,896	70,381	62,515	18,203	82.54
Buxar	Buxar	district	NP	102,591	54,123	84,468	13,639	94.16

=== 10 Largest Cities ===
List of largest populated cities in Bihar governed by a municipal corporation
Rank	Name	Image	District	Type*	Population 2011
1	Patna		Patna	UA	2,061,834
2	Gaya		Gaya	UA	474,093
3	Bhagalpur		Bhagalpur	UA	412,209
4	Muzaffarpur		Muzaffarpur	UA	354,462
5	Bihar Sharif		Nalanda	City	337,819
6	Purnia		Purnia	UA	325,307
7	Darbhanga		Darbhanga	UA	296,039
8	Sasaram		Rohtas	City	264,709
9	Arrah		Bhojpur	City	261,430
10	Samastipur		Samastipur	City	253,136
11	Begusarai		Begusarai	City	252,008
12	Katihar		Katihar	UA	240,838
13	Bettiah		West Champaran	UA	237,254
14	Motihari		East Champaran	City	221,646
15	Saharsa		Saharsa	City	216,491
16	Munger		Munger	City	213,303
17	Chhapra		Saran	UA	202,352
18	Siwan		Siwan	Town	191,385
19	Hajipur		Vaishali	Town	191,275
20	Madhubani		Madhubani	Town	164,165

- UA=Urban Agglomeration

== See also ==
- India
- Government of Bihar
- Administration in Bihar
- Districts of Bihar
- Divisions of India
- Subdivisions of Bihar
- Blocks in Bihar
- Villages in Bihar
