= List of cities and towns in Bhagalpur district =

This is a list of cities and towns in Bhagalpur district in the Indian state of Bihar.

== Bhagalpur ==
Bhagalpur is the largest city in Bhagalpur district and is situated on the southern bank of the Ganges river. It is the headquarter of the district. The old name of Bhagalpur is Champanagri which is capital of Anga Kingdom.

== Kahalgaon ==
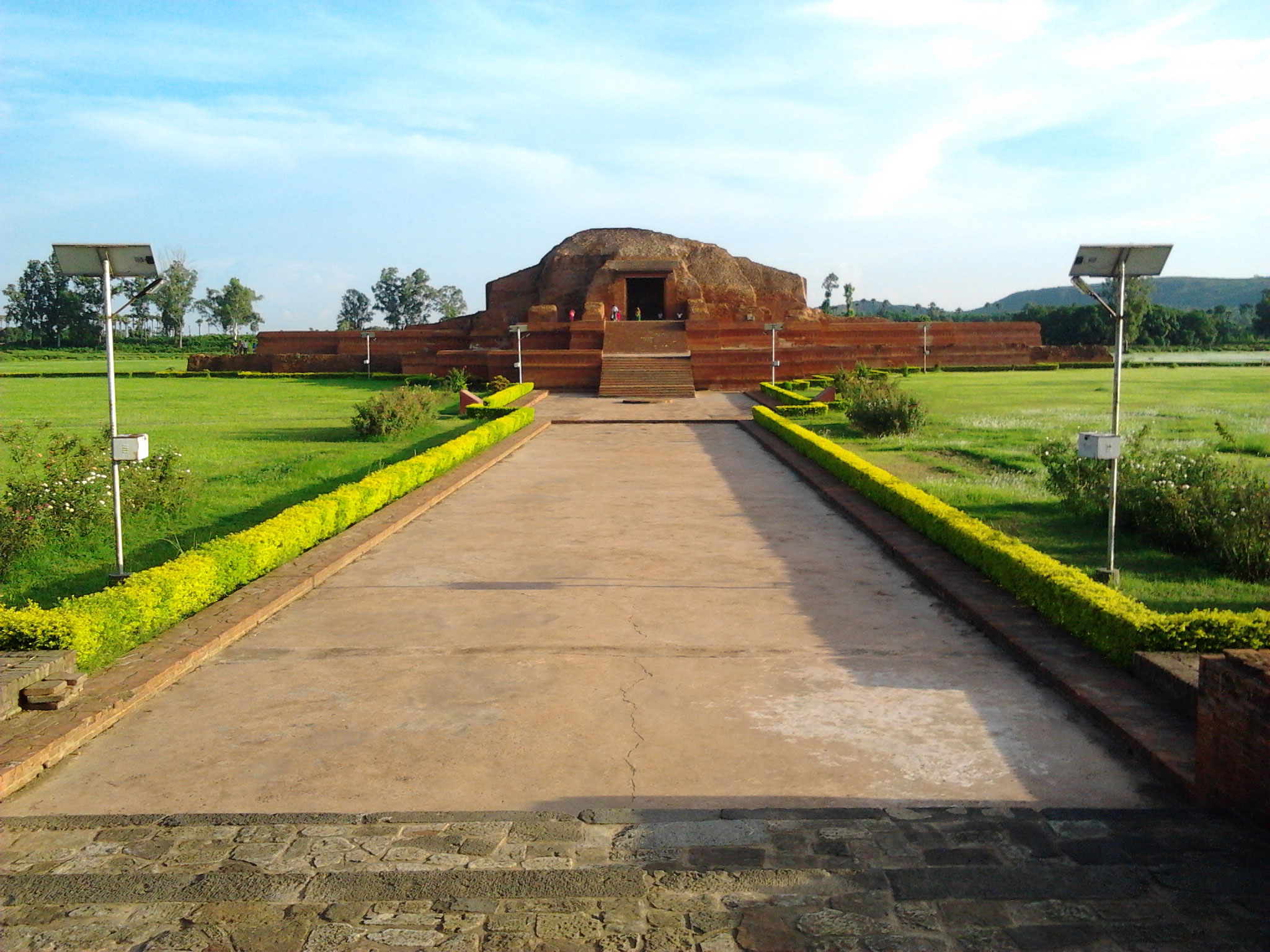
Vikramshila

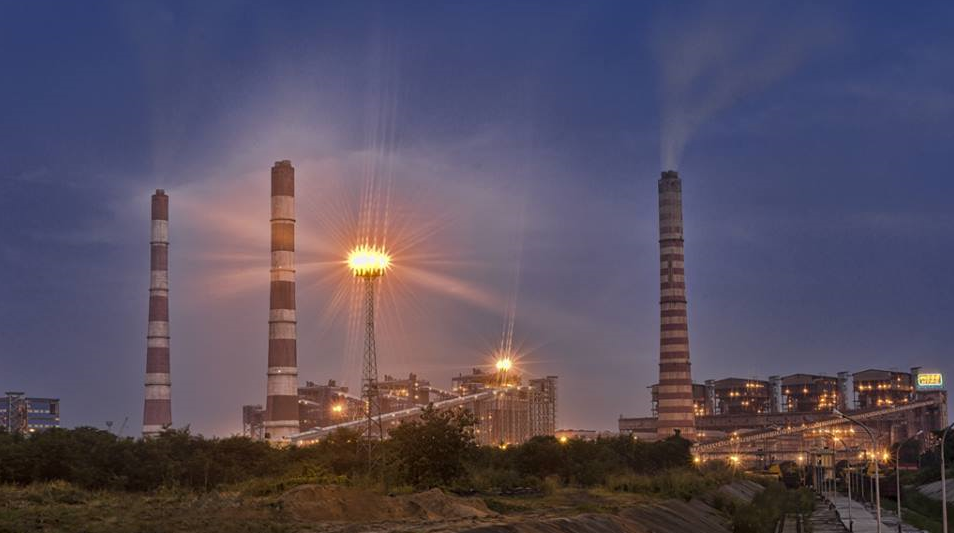
Kahalgaon Super Thermal Power Station

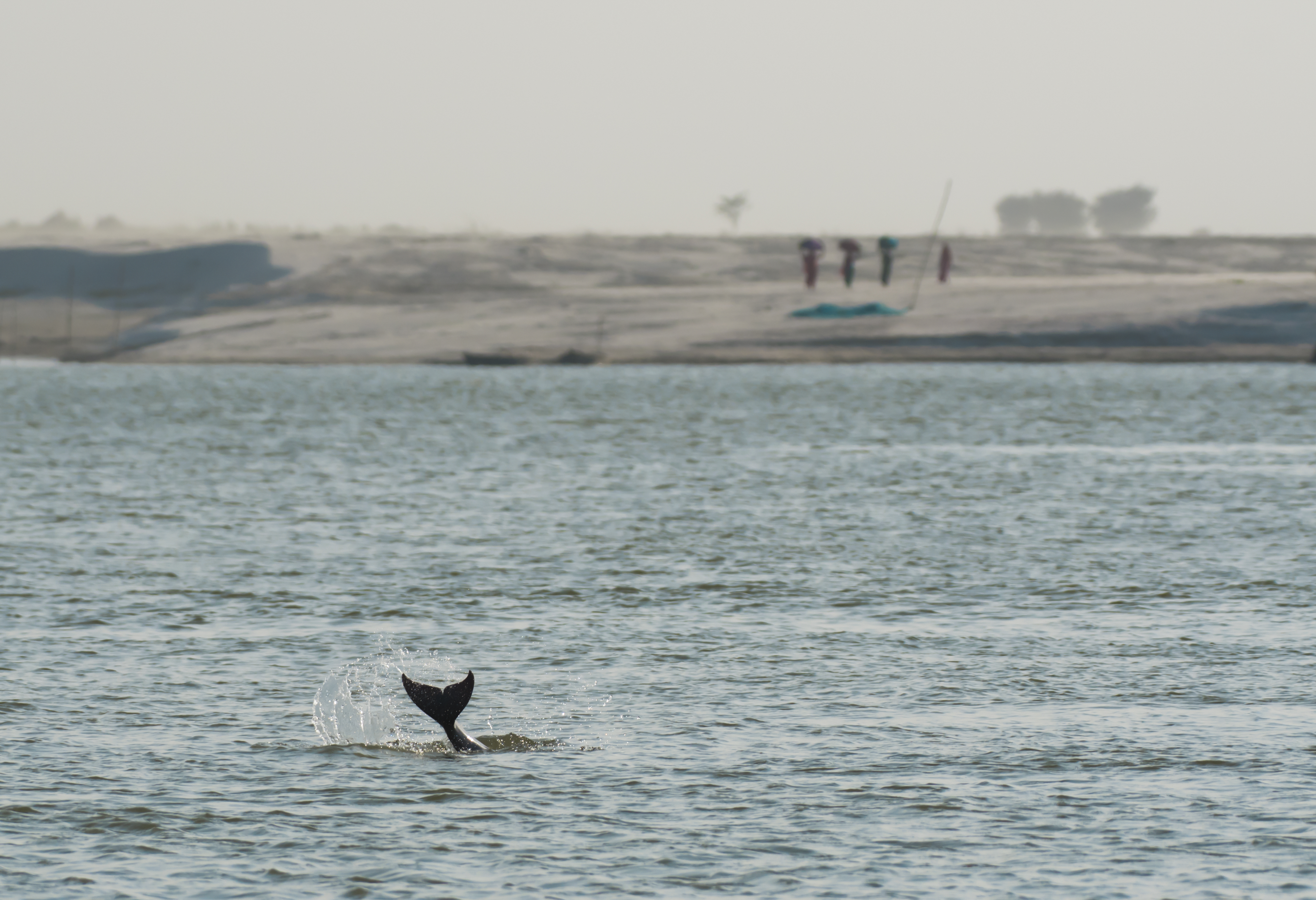
Vikramshila Gangetic Dolphin Sanctuary

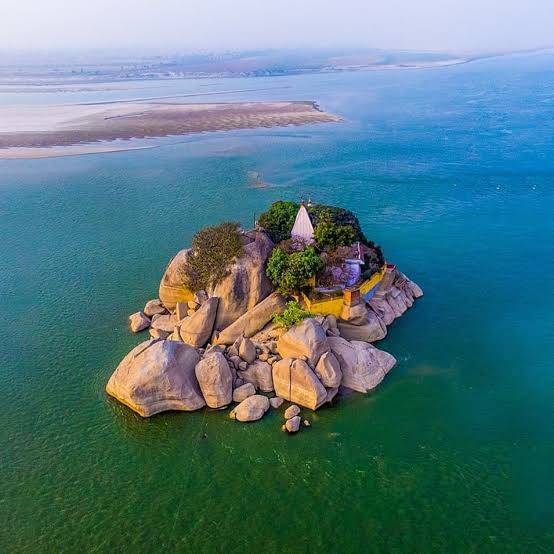
Mountain of Kahalgaon

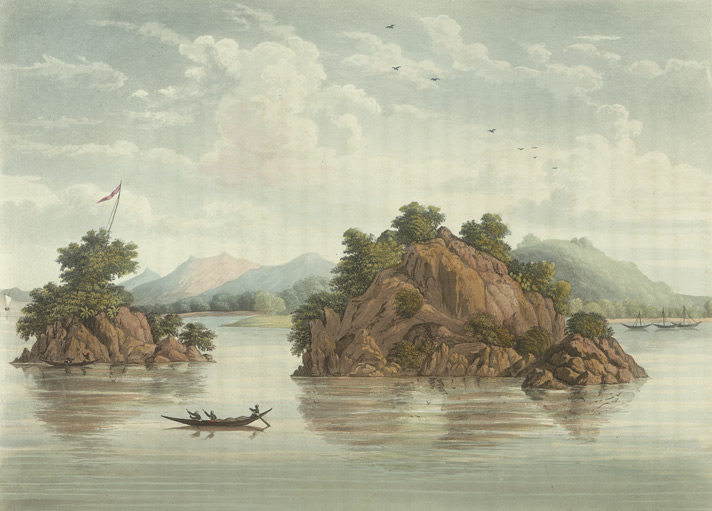
Golgong Rock Temple

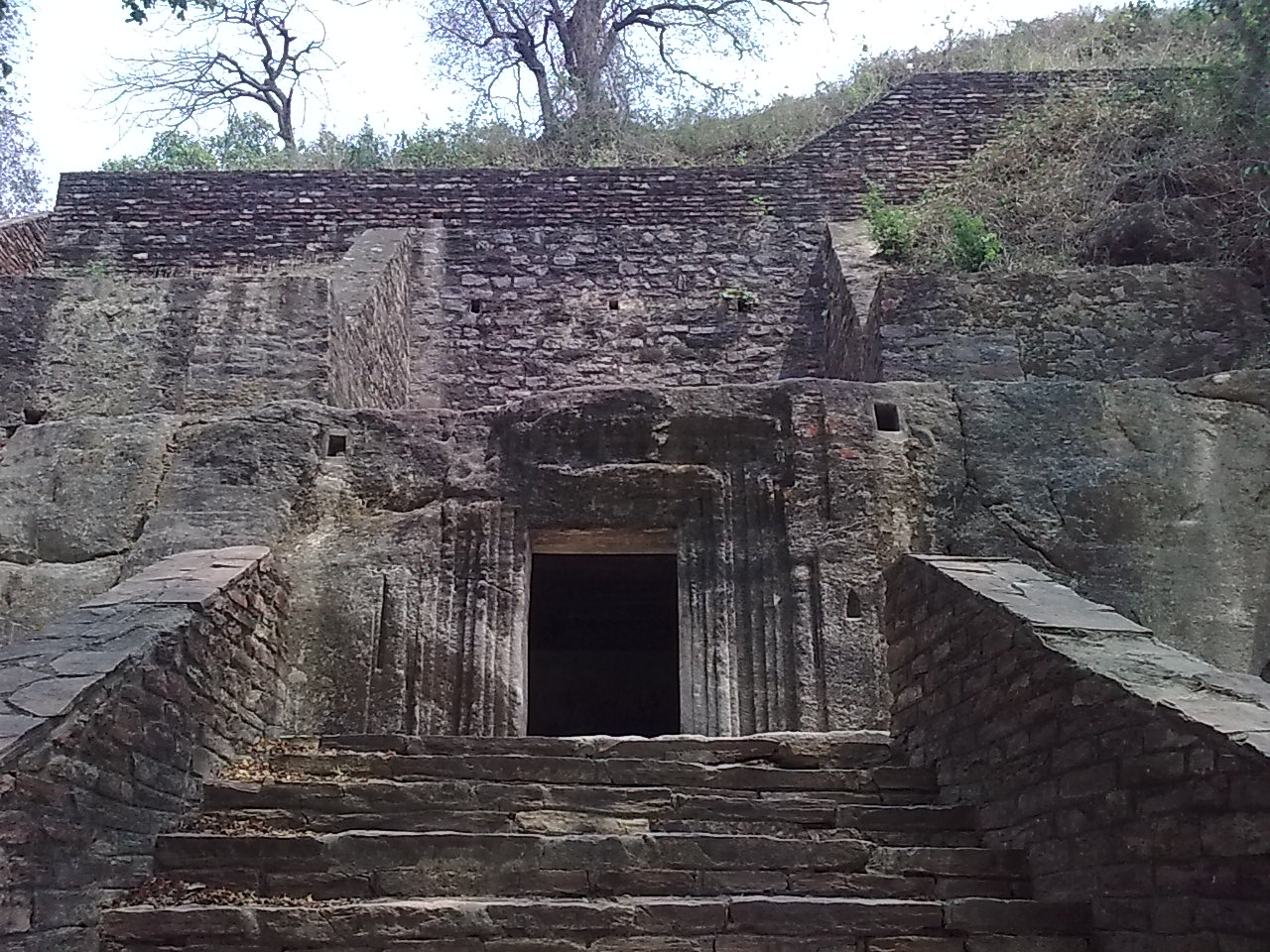
Bateshwar Sthan

Kahalgaon (formerly known as Colgong during British rule) is a municipality Town and one of 3 sub-divisions in Bhagalpur district in the state of Bihar, India. It is located close to the Vikramashila.

== Naugachhia ==
Naugachhia is a town and an important railway station in Bhagalpur district in the Indian state of Bihar. It is also a police district.

== Sultanganj ==
Ajgaibinath Dham
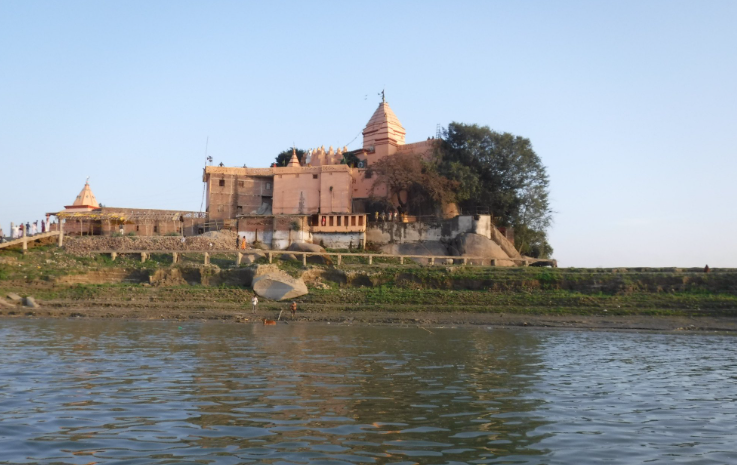

Religion
- Affiliation: Hinduism

Sultanganj is a town in Bhagalpur district of Bihar. It located 25km from Bhagalpur

== Habibpur ==
Habibpur is a town of Bhagalpur city and part of Bhagalpur Urban Agglomeration in Bhagalpur district.

== Sabour ==
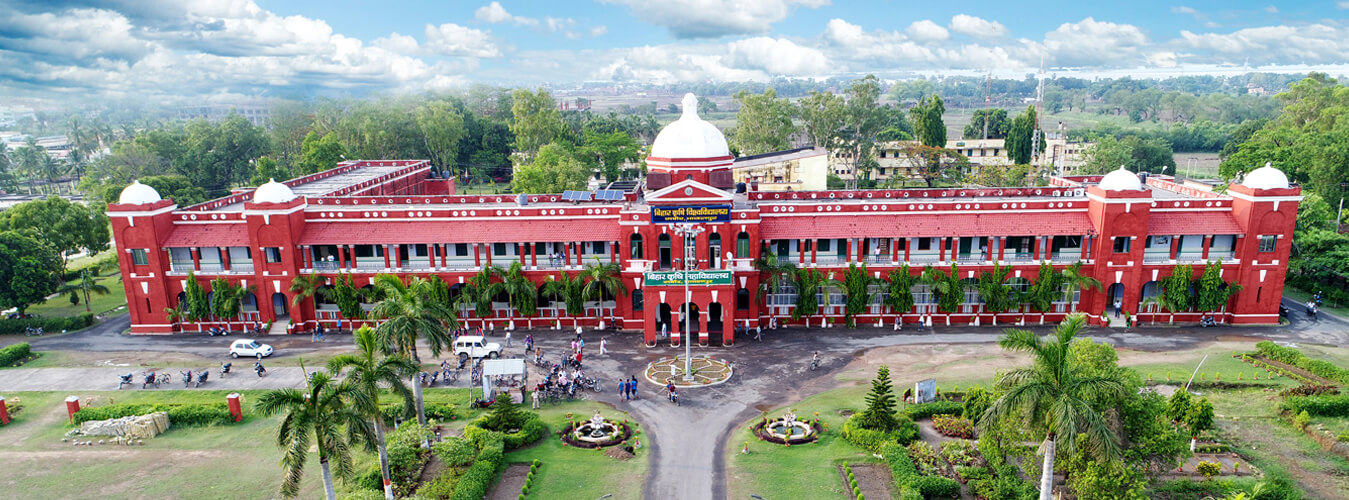
Bihar Agriculture college,Bhagalpur

Sabour is a town of Bhagalpur city in Bhagalpur district. It is an important education area Bhagalpur College of Engineering, Indian Institute of Information Technology, Bhagalpur and Bihar Agricultural University are located here.

== Nathnagar ==
Nathnagar is a town of Bhagalpur City. It is also a vidhansabha in Bhagalpur district.

== Pirpainti ==
Pirpainti is a town and a notified area in Bhagalpur district in the Indian state of Bihar. It is also a vidhansabha.

== Akbarnagar ==
Akbernagar is small town in Bhagalpur district.

== Puraini ==
Puraini is a town in Bhagalpur district and comes under Jagdishpur Block.

== Shahjangi ==
Shahjangi is one of the smallest town in Bhagalpur district.
