= Buddha Polytechnic Institute =

Engineering college in Gaya, India

- Other name: BPI College Gaya
- Type: Private engineering institution, graduate & undergraduate
- Established: 2010; 16 years ago
- Academic affiliations: SBTE Patna
- Chairman: Awadhesh Kumar
- Faculty: 60
- Administrative staff: 200
- Location: LIG-35, A P Colony, Gaya, Bihar 823001, India; 24.7891888°N 84.982477°E
- Campus: Urban, approx 20 acres (8.1 ha)
- Colours: White & black
- Mascot: Lord Buddha
- Website: bodhgayabit.com
- Location within Bihar Location within India

Buddha Polytechnic Institute, established in 2010, is a private polytechnic degree engineering college, a unit of Buddha Group of Institutions, situated in Gaya. It offers undergraduate degree engineering in electrical engineering, electronics, mechanical engineering and civil engineering. The college is affiliated with the State Board of Technical Education.

== Admission process ==
The Bihar Combined Entrance Competitive Examination Board conducts the entrance test. Based on the Merit List of the Bihar Combined Entrance Competitive Examination, successful candidates have to go through counseling. For lateral entry in the second year, one must have passed Diploma in Engineering/B.Sc. and should be in the merit list of Bihar Combined Entrance Competitive Examination Board.

== See also ==
- List of institutions of higher education in Bihar
- Education in Bihar
- Education in India
- Buddha Institute of Technology
