= Buddha Institute of Technology, Gaya =

Private engineering college in Bihar, India

Buddha Institute of Technology
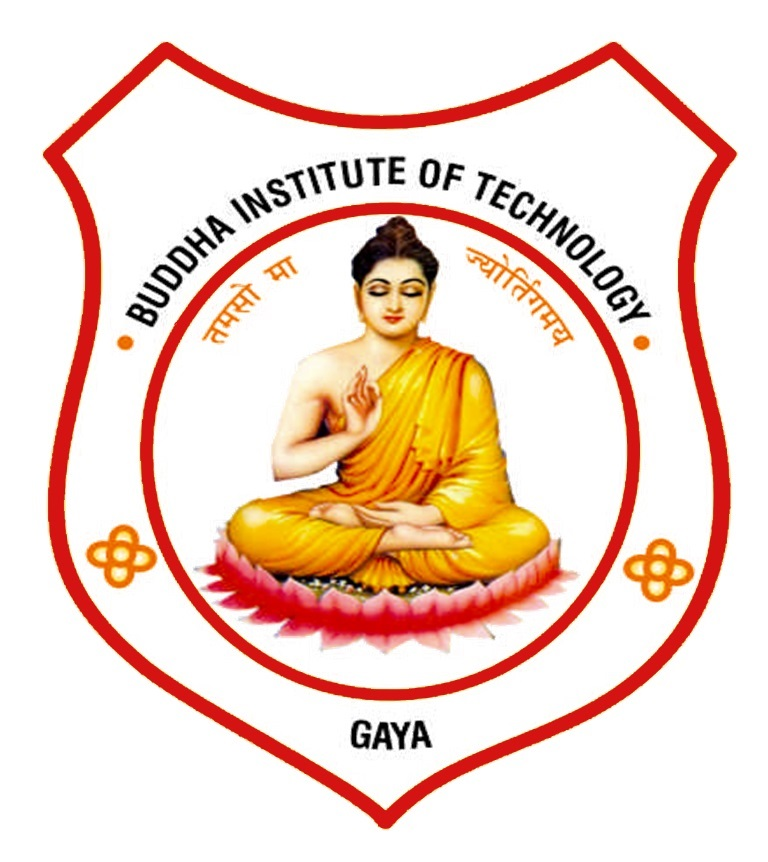
- Other name: BIT College Gaya
- Former names: BIT College Gaya; Buddha Institute of Technology
- Type: private engineering institution, graduate & Undergraduate
- Established: 2008 (18 years ago)
- Academic affiliations: Bihar Engineering University for B.Tech & State Board of Technical Education, Bihar for Polytechnic
- Chairman: Er. Awadhesh Kumar
- Faculty: 60
- Administrative staff: 200
- Location: Industrial Area, Gaya-Dobhi Road, Gaya, Bihar, 824231, India; 24.7280°N 84.9651°E
- Campus: Urban, approx 20 acres (8.1 ha)
- Colours: White & black
- Mascot: Lord Buddha
- Website: bodhgayabit.org bodhgayabit.net
- Location within Bihar Location within India

Buddha Institute of Technology, Gaya, also known as BIT, established in 2008, is a private degree engineering college, a unit of Buddha Group of Institutions, situated in Gaya, Bihar, India. It offers undergraduate degree engineering in electrical engineering, mechanical engineering, civil engineering and computer science. This college is affiliated with the Aryabhatta Knowledge University (AKU) for B.Tech. Engineering & SBTE for Diploma (Polytechnic) Engineering.

== Courses ==
- B.Tech
- Diploma (Polytechnic)
- BCA
- BBA
- B.Com

== Facilities ==
- Hostels
- Pitch (sports field) Sports ground
- Indoor games and sports
- Sports venue
- Primary Health Centre (India) & Community health center
- Common room for Teachers
- Cafeteria for Students & Teacher

== Admission Process ==
Enrollment in Buddha Institute of Technology is done through the state level entrance exam BCECE (Bihar Combined Entrance Competitive Examination) or BPTPIA (Bihar Private Technical and Professional Institutions Association).

=== Polytechnic ===
- 2018 - BPTPIA
- 2019 - BCECE
- 2020 - BCECE
- 2021 - BCECE
- 2022 - BCECE
- 2023 - BPTPIA
- 2024 - BPTPIA

=== B.Tech ===
- 2018 - BPTPIA
- 2019 - BPTPIA
- 2020 - BPTPIA
- 2021 - BCECE
- 2022 - BCECE
- 2023 - BPTPIA
- 2024 - BPTPIA

== See also ==
- List of institutions of higher education in Bihar
- Education in Bihar
- Education in India
- Buddha Polytechnic Institute
