= Saidpur Dabra =

Village in Bihar, India

- Village
- Location within Bihar Location within India
- Coordinates: 25°19′08″N 87°10′49″E
- Country: India
- State: Bihar
- District: Bhagalpur
- Block: Gopalpur

Government
  - Type: Sarpanch

Area
  - Total: 28.91 km^{2} (11.16 sq mi)
- Elevation: 37 m (121 ft)

Population (2011)
  - Total: 37,101
  - Density: 1,283/km^{2} (3,324/sq mi)

Languages
  - Official: Angika
- Time zone: UTC+5:30 (IST)
- PIN: 853205
- STD code: 06421
- Vehicle registration: BR-10

Saidpur Dabra is a village in Gopalpur Block, Bhagalpur District, Bihar, India. It is located near the state boundary with Jharkhand, about 21 kilometres northeast of the district seat Bhagalpur, and 19 kilometres northeast of the block seat Gopalpur. In the year 2011, it has a total population of 37,101.

== Geography ==
Saidpur Dabra is on the north bank of the Ganges, near the confluence of the Ganges and Kosi River. Ratanganj is situated to its north, Tintanga Diyara North to its east, Parasrampur Milik to its south across the Ganges, and Dimha to its west. It covers an area of 2,891 hectares.

== Demographics ==
According to the 2011 Census of India, there were 7,172 households within Saidpur Dabra. Among the 37,101 residents, 19,677 are male and 17,424 are female. The literacy rate is 53.62%, with 11,894 of the male population and 8,001 of the female population being literate. The census location code of this village is 238987.
