= Charoun, Munger =

Charoun
- village
- Location in Bihar, India
- Coordinates: 25°13′N 86°19′E
- Country: India
- State: Bihar
- District: Munger
- Area: 10 km^{2} (3.9 sq mi)

Dimensions
  - Length: 2 km (1.2 mi)
  - Width: 1.1 km (0.68 mi)

Literacy
  - Total: 79.46%
  - Male: 84.79%
  - Female: 73.42%
- Time zone: UTC+05:30 (IST)
- PIN: 811201
- Sex ratio: 898 females per 1000 males ♂/♀

Charoun is a village of Munger district in the Indian state of Bihar. It is situated 7 km (4.3 mi) from Munger city centre. Charoun is a part of the Munger-Jamalpur twin cities.

== Geography ==
Charoun is located at 25°13′N 86°19′E at an average elevation of 125 m (410 ft).

It is in the Munger district and the city of Munger is 8 km (5.0 mi) east of Charoun. Charoun is an overnight rail or road journey from Kolkata.

The nearest airport is Jay Prakash Narayan Airport in Patna, 204 km (127 mi) away. The nearest international airport is Netaji Subhas Chandra Bose International Airport in Kolkata, 454 km (282 mi) from Charoun on National Highway 80.

== Demographics ==
As of the 2011 census Charoun has a population of 2,254, with a ratio of 871 females for every 1,000 males. The average literacy rate is 87.38 percent; for men it is 92.58 percent, and for women it is 81.40 percent. There are 398 children in charoun aged 0 to 5, with a ratio of 867 girls for every 1,000 boys.

== See also ==
- List of cities in Bihar
