= Niranjan Kumar Mehta =

Indian politician

Bihar Legislative Assembly
- Incumbent
- Assumed office 2015
- Preceded by: Renu Kushawaha
- Constituency: Bihariganj

Personal details
- Born: Madhuban
- Party: Janata Dal United
- Occupation: Politician

Niranjan Kumar Mehta is an Indian politician from Bihar and a Member of the Bihar Legislative Assembly. Mehta won from Bihariganj Assembly constituency on the Janata Dal (United) ticket in the 2020 Bihar Legislative Assembly election.

== Political career ==
Before becoming a Member of Bihar Legislative Assembly, Mehta has served as Mukhiya of Madhuban Panchayat in Udakishunganj.

Mehta was elected to Bihar Legislative Assembly twice in 2015 and 2020 from Bihariganj Assembly constituency. This constituency is a part of Madhepura Lok Sabha constituency and veteran leader Sharad Yadav used to represent this region in Lok Sabha. In 2020, Mehta defeated daughter of Yadav, Subhashini Yadav with a fair margin to clinch the victory for the second time. Mehta raised the issue of unfair prices of maize crop, at which the farmers of Madhepura region were forced to sell their surplus maize. He advocated fixation of fair price for the farmers in order to benefit them during surplus production of maize in his constituency. He also worked for reconstruction of Uda-Madhuban roadway, which was made during the tenure of legislator Singheswar Prasad Mehta between 1980-85.

Mehta is also associated with Kushwaha Rajnaitik Vichar Manch, an organisation working for political rights of Koeri caste.

== Controversies ==
An audio clip of Mehta was aired in 2017, in which he was found involved in telephonic conversation with a person, who was alleging him of taking bribe in name of helping him get a government job. A complaint was also made by a person named Nandan Mehta against him in this regard.
