= Barari =

Barari can refer to:

- Barari Assembly constituency, assembly constituency in Katihar district, Bihar, India
- Barari (panchayat), panchayat in Sitamarhi district, Bihar, India
- Barari (surname)

== See also ==
- Battle of Barari Ghat, 1760 battle in Burari, modern-day Delhi
