= Khanpurmal =

- village
- Location in Bihar, India Khanpurmal (India)
- Coordinates: 25°10′16″N 86°45′46″E
- Country: India
- State: Bihar
- District: Bhagalpur

Languages
  - Official: Angika, Hindi
- Time zone: UTC+5:30 (IST)
- PIN: 813108
- ISO 3166 code: IN-BR

Khanpurmal or Khanpur (mal) is a village located in the Bhagalpur district of Bihar state in India. It comes under Sultanganj Police station and around 10 km from river Ganges, which flows through Sultanganj. People of this village are mostly dependent on farming as this village is gifted with highly fertile lands. There are many small rivers that surrounds this village including Bharguri. Khanpurmal is having a post office as well. Khanpurmal is well connected to nearest villages and towns by road.
