= Nalanda College of Engineering =

Government engineering college in Nalanda, Bihar

- Type: Public
- Established: 2008 (18 years ago)
- Affiliations: Bihar Engineering University
- Principal: Dr Gopal Nandan
- Dean: Dr.Ashish kumar
- Mentor Institute: Indian Institute of Technology Bombay
- Students: 1000+
- Undergraduates: BTech
- Postgraduates: MTech
- Location: Nalanda, Bihar, 803108, India
- Campus: Sub Urban 51.64 acres (208,979.7 m^{2})
- Nickname: NCEians
- Website: www.ncechandi.ac.in

Nalanda College of Engineering (NCE) is a government engineering college situated at Chandi town, near Nalanda city in Bihar state of India. It was inaugurated on 19 November 2008 by the chief minister of Bihar, Nitish Kumar. It is affiliated to Bihar Engineering University. The college is managed by Department of Science and Technology, Bihar.

== History ==
Nalanda College of Engineering is a Government Engineering College working under the Department of Science and Technology Bihar state, India. It was established by the Government of Bihar. Its foundation was laid by the chief minister of Bihar Nitish Kumar in 2008. It is situated on the holy land where Lord Buddha experienced enlightenment and Lord Vardhaman Mahavir embraced Nirvana. It belongs to the land of ancient Nalanda University where students from across the world studied Buddhism.

== Campus ==
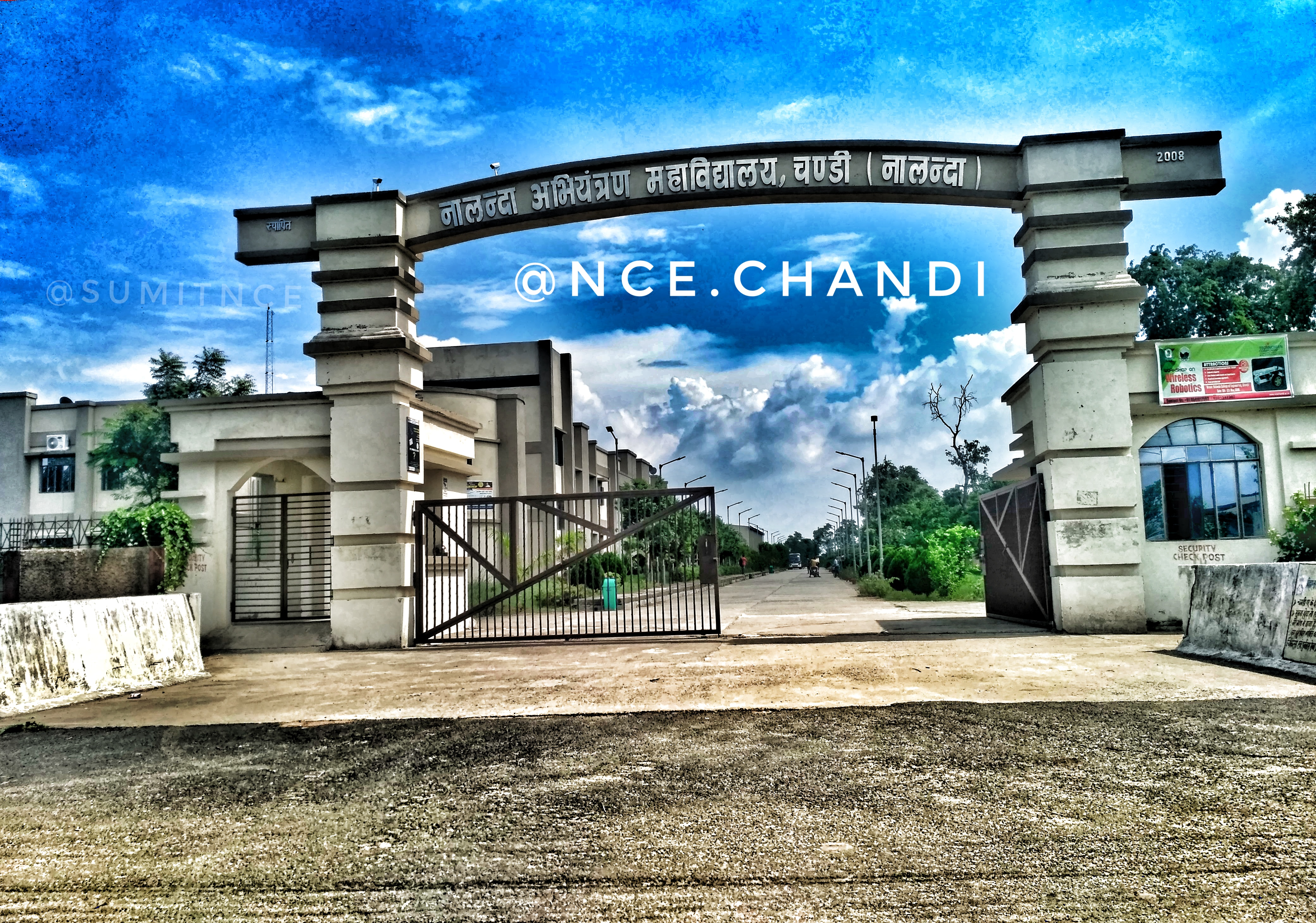
Entrance Gate of NCE Chandi

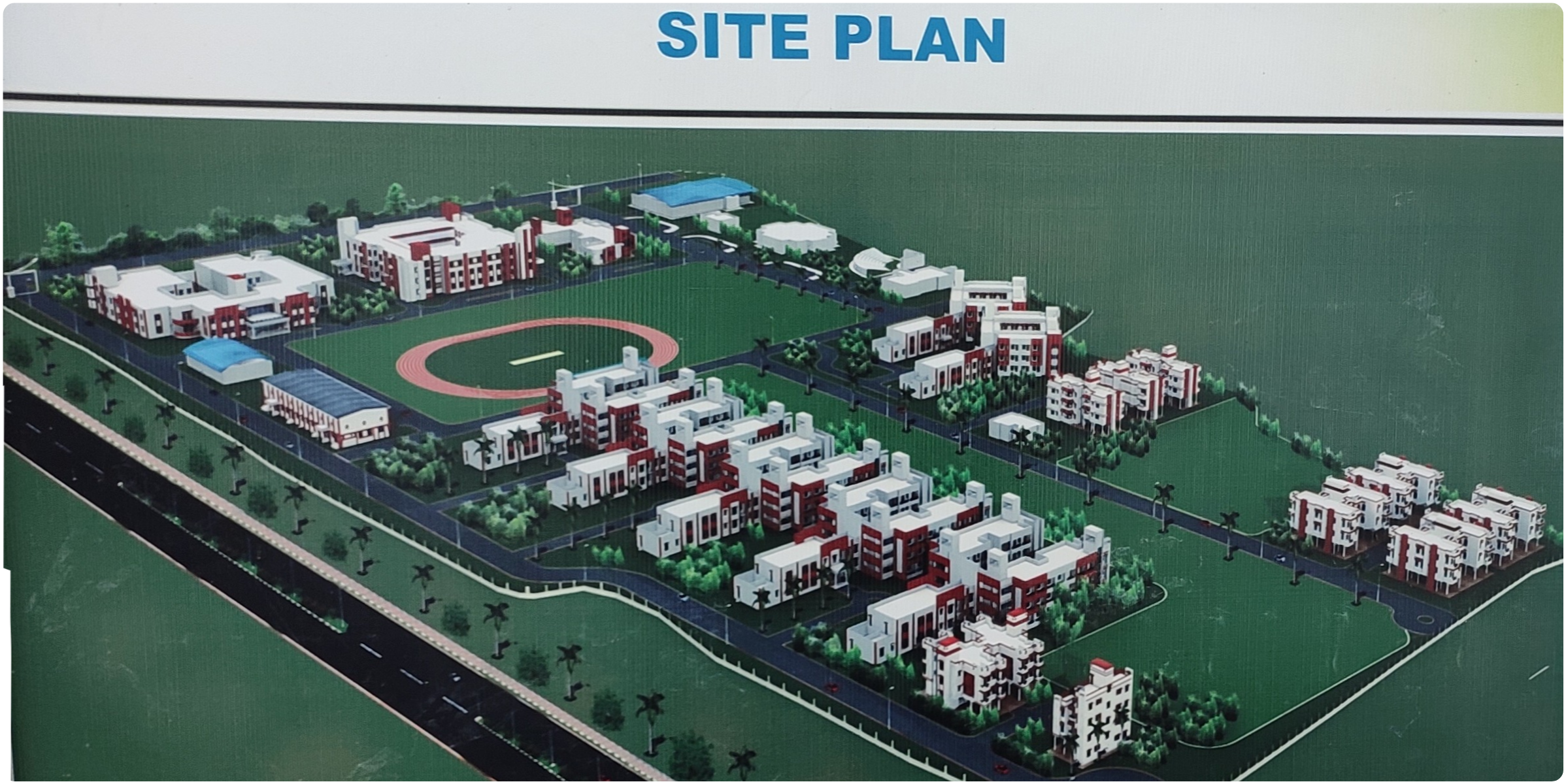
Proposed campus map of NCE, Chandi

NCE Chandi functions from a 51.64 acres (21 ha) campus in Chandi, Bihar. It is located at 17.3 km distance from the District's main city Bihar Sharif and 42 km from the State's capital city Patna.

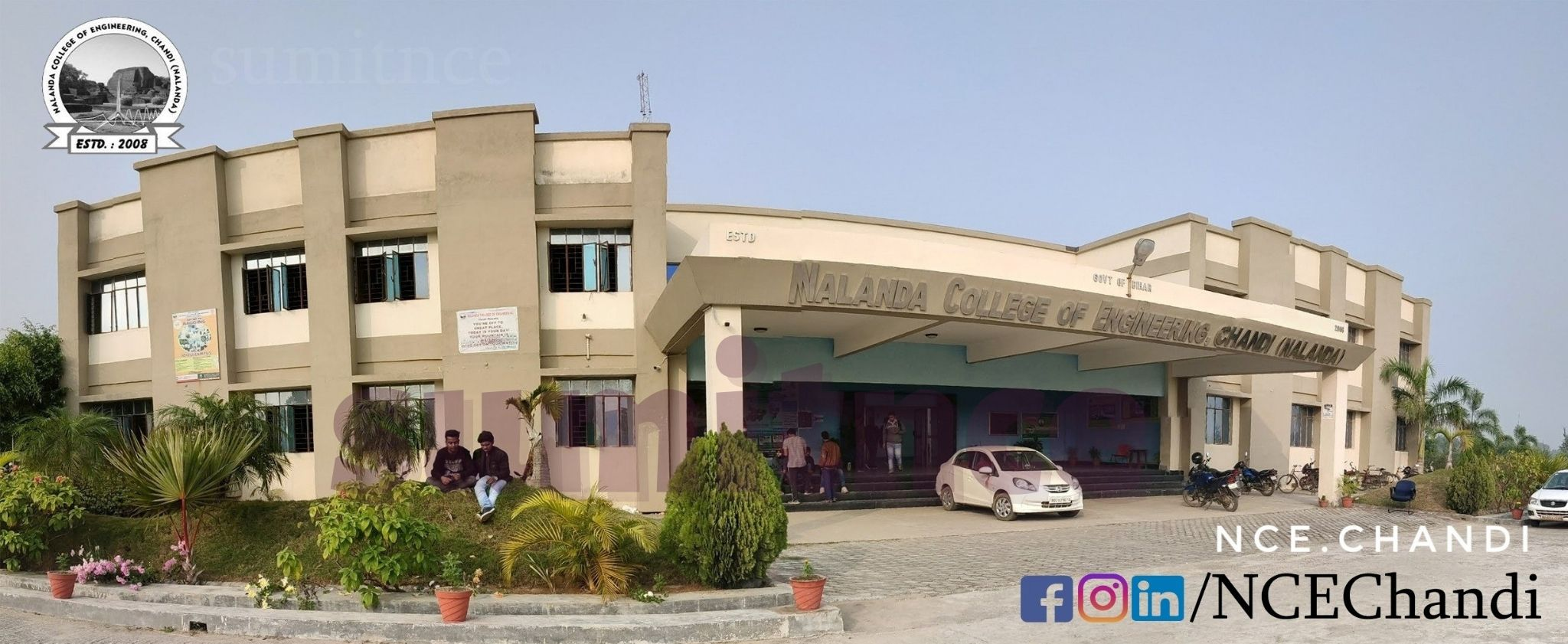
Administrative Building NCE Chandi

Five buildings including laboratory, workshops, girls' and boys' hostels and residence for the principal have been constructed at a cost of around Rs 40 crores in the first phase. In the second phase the tender process for the construction of another 22 major and nearly a dozen minor buildings at an estimated cost of Rs 180 crore, is being initiated. The initial cost of entire construction was estimated at around Rs 166 crore in 2012 which increased to Rs 220 crore in three years.

== Academics ==
Nalanda College of Engineering offers undergraduate courses in the field of engineering and technology. Its courses are recognised by the All India Council for Technical Education (AICTE). Admission is through Bihar Combined Entrance Competitive Examination Board (BCECE). Vocational courses admission, directly to the second year, is through the BCECE Lateral Entry Competitive Examination.

=== Admission ===
2019 onwards the admissions are done only through the merit list of the national level competitive exam Joint Entrance Examination – Main. Students desiring to take admission must appear in the "Joint Entrance Examination – Main" exam that is conducted by National Testing Agency.

Earlier Undergraduate admissions were done through the Bihar Combined Entrance Competitive Examination Board conducted by Bihar Combined Entrance Competitive Examination Board, Under Bihar Combined Entrance Competitive Examination Act 1995 of Bihar government. The Entrance examination has two stages: First stage is the screening test or preliminary test. The screened candidates have to appear in the main examination (second stage). Based on the merit list of the second stage, candidates are allotted seats in different engineering colleges of Bihar.

Admission to postgraduate programmes is based upon the score and rank in Graduate Aptitude Test in Engineering (GATE) conducted by IITs/IISc.

== Departments ==
The colleges includes the following departments:

- Department of Computer Science & Engineering
- Department of Civil Engineering
- Department of Electrical & Electronics Engineering
- Department of Mechanical Engineering
- Department of Aeronautical engineering
- Department of Artificial Intelligence and Machine Learning
- Department of Applied Science & Humanities

== Student life ==
=== Student societies ===
- Training And Placement Cell = www.linkedin.com/company/training-and-placement-cell-nce-chandi
- Internship Cell
- Coding Club
- Technical Club
- Science Club
- Sports Club
- Civil Services Club
- Entrepreneurship Cell
- Startup Cell
- Institute Innovation Cell
- Photography Club (Spark)
- NSS Club
- Chirag (Social activity cell)

Chirag is a non-profit organization which works to educate the needy children in society. This organisation was initiated by students of NCE, Chandi.

=== Facilities ===
- Computer Center
- Central Library

The library has a collection of more than 10000 books and more than 80 Journal covering almost all areas of different departments of engineering. Every department has newsletter e-publication covering the activities of the department. There is one college newsletter every month. Library has been divided into 3 sections: Lending section, Reading section and Reference section. Every department has its own departmental library loaded with a collection of books related to its specializations, soft version of project reports of students and CDs of online course contents.

- Hostels

There are total Four girls' and boys hostel.

- Sports Facility

There is a sports club in the college.

=== Festivals ===
The major annual festival organised by NCEians every year are :

- ATISA : Atisa (Atisa NCE)== atisance.in is The Technical Fest of Nalanda College of Engineering.
- PRARAMBHA : (Prarambha NCE) is The Annual Fest of Nalanda College of Engineering.

=== Notable alumni ===
1. Ankit Kumar of 2017 Batch Civil Engineering, studying Masters' at IIT ISM Dhanbad department of Civil Engineering (Water Resource Engineering).
2. Akash of 2008 Batch, Civil Engineering, working as Assistant Professor(presently posted at GEC Nawada)in department of Science Technology and Technical Education, Government of Bihar since 2018.
