= Bihariganj Assembly constituency =

Coordinates: 25°44′09″N 86°58′45″E

Bihariganj
- Constituency No. - for the Bihar Legislative Assembly

Constituency details
- Country: India
- Region: East India
- State: Bihar
- District: Madhepura
- Established: 2008
- Total electors: 327,455
- Reservation: None

Member of Legislative Assembly
- 18th Bihar Legislative Assembly
- Incumbent Niranjan Kumar Mehta
- Party: JD(U)
- Alliance: NDA
- Elected year: 2025

Bihariganj Assembly constituency is an assembly constituency in Madhepura district in the Indian state of Bihar. Niranjan Kumar Mehta of Janata Dal (United) is the current MLA.

== Overview ==
As per Delimitation of Parliamentary and Assembly constituencies Order, 2008, No. 71 Bihariganj Assembly constituency is composed of the following: Bihariganj and Gwalpara community development blocks; Biriranpal, Madhuban, Rampur Khora, Kishunganj, Pararia, Barahi Anadpura and Pipra Karoti gram panchayats of Uda Kishunganj CD Block; Gram Panchayats Haripur Kala, Digghi, Singiyon, Raghunathpur, Kolhaypatti Dumriya, Rajni, Gangapur, Dinapatti Sakhuwa, Pokhram Parmanadpur, Jorgama, and Rampur gram panchayats and Murliganj notified area of Murliganj CD Block.

Biharganj Assembly constituency is part of No. 13 Madhepura (Lok Sabha constituency).

== Members of the Legislative Assembly ==
Year	Member	Party
Before 2008: Constituency did not exist
2010	Renu Kushawaha	Janata Dal (United)
2015	Niranjan Kumar Mehta	Janata Dal (United)
2020	Niranjan Kumar Mehta	Janata Dal (United)
2025	Niranjan Kumar Mehta	Janata Dal (United)

== Election results ==
=== 2025 ===
Bihar Assembly election, 2025: Bihariganj
Party	Candidate	Votes	%	±%
JD(U)	Niranjan Kumar Mehta	116,622	52.12	+8.49
RJD	Renu Kushawaha	85,000	37.99	
Independent	Karn Kumar Mishra	5,372	2.4	
JSP	Amlesh Roy	4,486	2.0	
SUCI(C)	Pankaj Kumar Jaiswal	2,493	1.11	
BSP	Rabindra Kumar	2,199	0.98	
NOTA	None of the above	5,915	2.64	+1.79
Majority		31,622	14.13	+4.11
Turnout		223,746	68.33	+7.8
JD(U) hold		Swing		

=== 2020 ===
Bihar Assembly election, 2020: Bihariganj
Party	Candidate	Votes	%	±%
JD(U)	Niranjan Kumar Mehta	81,531	43.63	−1.63
INC	Subhashini Bundela	62,820	33.61	
LJP	Vijay Kumar Singh	8,764	4.69	
JAP(L)	Prabhash Kumar	5,604	3.0	−4.06
Sanyukt Vikas Party	Shakuntala Devi	4,883	2.61	
Rashtrawadi Janlok Party (Satya)	Sumit Kumar Alias Sumitranandan Swami	3,309	1.77	
Proutist Sarva Samaj	Vijay Prabhat	2,802	1.5	
Independent	Anila Devi	1,769	0.95	
NOTA	None of the above	1,590	0.85	−0.81
Majority		18,711	10.02	−6.88
Turnout		186,883	60.53	−0.4
JDU gain from INC		Swing		

=== 2015 ===
2015 Bihar Legislative Assembly election: Bihariganj
Party	Candidate	Votes	%	±%
JD(U)	Niranjan Kumar Mehta	78,361	45.26	
BJP	Ravindra Charan Yadav	49,108	28.36	
JAP(L)	Swet Kamal	12,218	7.06	
Independent	Brahamchari Vishnu Prabhakar	4,915	2.84	
CPI	Nikhil Kumar Jha	4,653	2.69	
Independent	Shanti Devi	4,339	2.51	
Independent	Manoj Kumar Yadav	4,318	2.49	
Independent	Khwaja Gulam Husain	3,520	2.03	
BSP	Pratibha Kumari	1,859	1.07	
NOTA	None of the above	2,868	1.66	
Majority		29,253	16.9	
Turnout		173,137	60.93	

== See also ==
- Bihariganj
- Bihariganj (Community development block)
