= Gwalpara (community development block) =

Community development block in Madhepura district, Bihar, India

Gwalpara ग्वालपाड़ा
- Community development block
- Location in Bihar, India Gwalpara (India)
- Coordinates: 25°45′02″N 86°52′52″E
- Country: India
- State: Bihar
- Region: Mithila
- District: Madhepura

Government
  - Type: Community development block

Population (2001)
  - Total: 95,295

Languages
  - Official: Maithili, Hindi
- Time zone: UTC+5:30 (IST)
- Lok Sabha constituency: Madhepura
- Vidhan Sabha constituency: Bihariganj
- Website: madhepura.bih.nic.in

Gwalpara is one of the administrative divisions of Madhepura district in the Indian state of Bihar. The block headquarters are located at a distance of 23 km from the district headquarters, namely, at Madhepura.

== Geography ==
Gwalpara is located at 25°45′02″N 86°52′52″E

=== Panchayats ===
Panchayats in Gwalpara community development block are: Reshna, Jhitkiya kalhot, Birgaon chatra, Sukhasan, Temabhela, Sahpur, Gualpara, Sarauni, Khokhsi, Jhalari, Pirnagar and Bisbari.

== Demographics ==
In the 2001 census Gwalpara Block had a population of 95,295.

== Education ==
At Gwalpara there are a renowned high school and a middle school named Madhuram Rajkiya Krit Uchh Vidyalaya is upgraded to "Madhyam(+2) high school and Madhuram Rajkiya Krit Madhya Vidyalaya.
