= Bihariganj (community development block) =

Community development block in Madhepura district, Bihar, India

Bihariganj बिहारिगंज
- Community development block
- Location in Bihar, India Bihariganj (India)
- Coordinates: 25°44′09″N 86°58′45″E
- Country: India
- State: Bihar
- Region: Mithila
- District: Madhepura

Population (2001)
  - Total: 101,655

Languages
  - Official: Maithili, Hindi
- Time zone: UTC+5:30 (IST)
- Lok Sabha constituency: Madhepura
- Vidhan Sabha constituency: Bihariganj
- Website: madhepura.bih.nic.in

Bihariganj is one of the administrative divisions of Madhepura district in the Indian state of Bihar. The block headquarters, Bihariganj, is located at a distance of 41 km from the district headquarters, namely, Madhepura. It is one of the main markets and is connected with neighbouring district Purnia by road and railways.

== Geography ==
Bihariganj is located at 25°44′09″N 86°58′45″E.

=== Panchayats ===
Panchayats in Bihariganj community development block are: Pararia, Rajganj, Mohanpur, Gamail, Lakshmipur lalchand, Madhukarchak, Bhabangama, Shekpura, Tulsia, Kusthan, Bihariganj and Hathiaundha.

== Demographics ==
In the 2001 census Bihariganj Block had a population of 101,655. Bihariganj has 12 Mukhiya & 17 Panchyat samity sadasya.

== See also ==
- Bihariganj
