= Kharik, Bhagalpur =

Village in Bihar, India

Kharik
- Village
- Location within Bihar Location within India
- Coordinates: 25°22′05″N 87°00′04″E
- Country: India
- State: Bihar
- District: Bhagalpur
- Block: Kharik

Government
  - Type: Village Panchayat

Area
  - Total: 1,594 km^{2} (615 sq mi)
- Elevation: 34 m (112 ft)

Population (2011)
  - Total: 42,354
  - Density: 26.57/km^{2} (68.82/sq mi)

Languages
  - Official: Angika, Hindi
- Time zone: UTC+5:30 (IST)
- PIN: 853202
- STD code: 0641
- Vehicle registration: BR-10

Kharik is a village and the administrative center of Kharik Block, Bhagalpur District, Bihar, India. It is located on the northern part of the district, approximately 14 kilometres north of the district capital Bhagalpur. In 2011, It has 42,354 inhabitants.

== Geography ==
Kharik is situated between the Kosi River and the Ganges River. Mohanpur-Bihariganj Road is to the north of the village. The average elevation of Kharik is 34 metres above the sea level.

== Demographics ==
According to 2011 Census of India, there are 8,344 households within Kharik. Among the 42,354 residents, 22,683 are male and 19,671 are female. The total literacy rate is 53.93%, with 13,523 of the male population and 9,317 of the female population being literate. The census location code of the village is 238921.
