= Government Polytechnic, Bhagalpur =

Public technical institute in Bihar, India

- Other names: GP, Bhagalpur
- Established: 1955 (71 years ago)
- Academic affiliations: SBTE
- Location: Bhagalpur, Bihar, India; 25°15′46″N 87°01′13″E
- Website: gpbgp.org

Government Polytechnic, Bhagalpur is a polytechnic institute in Bihar, India. It is administered by Department of Science and Technology, Bihar and is funded by Government of Bihar. The institute is affiliated with State Board of Technical Education, Bihar which conducts the semester exams and issues the certificates. It was established in 1955.

== Courses ==
The Institute offers six-semester (three years) diploma programmes in engineering.

== Admission ==
Admission to the first semester (first year) diploma programme in the institute is done through Diploma Certificate Entrance Competitive Examination (DCECE) conducted by Bihar Combined Entrance Competitive Examination Board. The institute also offers lateral entry admissions to the third semester (second year) which is done through DECE (LE) conducted by Bihar Combined Entrance Competitive Examination Board.
