= Indian Institute of Information Technology, Bhagalpur =

Government education institute in Bihar, India

- Motto: चारित्र्यं मम जीवनम्
- Type: Public-Private Partnership (PPP)
- Established: 2017; 9 years ago
- Chairperson: Dr. Ashok Khade
- Director: Madhusudan Singh
- Undergraduates: 900+
- Postgraduates: 50+
- Location: Sabour, Bhagalpur, Bihar, India; 25.2553°N 87.0428°E
- Campus: Urban
- Acronym: IIIT Bhagalpur
- Website: www.iiitbh.ac.in

Indian Institute of Information Technology, Bhagalpur (IIIT Bhagalpur) is one of the IIITs set up by Ministry of Education, Government of India in Public Private Partnership (PPP) mode. It is located on the southern bank of the Ganga River in Sabour , Bhagalpur, the 2nd largest city of Bihar. It was declared as an Institute of National Importance (INI) in September 2020 by Parliament of India. The construction of Phase-1 of its new building/campus was completed in 2024. The institute is now fully functional from its permanent campus in Sabour.

The institute started functioning from July 2017 in a 50-acres campus of BCE campus. Its mentoring Institute is Indian Institute of Technology Guwahati (IITG). IIIT Bhagalpur has signed a memorandum of agreement (MoA) with eduCLaas of Singapore to start two PG diploma courses – Digital Business Management (DBM), Software Engineering and Management (SEM) from this year. Meanwhile, the institute has not distributed degree certificates to students from its 2018-22 batches onwards and, as of now, has no public plans to do so in the near future.

== History ==
The Government of India decided to establish new IIITs in different states in 2010, and National Screening Committee (NSC), in its second meeting on 14 March 2012, asked the Government of Bihar for a detailed project report (DPR). The proposal for IIIT Bhagalpur was passed by the NSC on 2 September 2016.

IIIT Bhagalpur has been set up on a Public–private partnership (PPP) basis. Fifty percent of the stakes are held by Ministry of Education (MoE), Government of India, whereas thirty-five percent is held by the state government; the rest is held by industry partner Beltron. Indian Institute of Technology Guwahati (IITG) has declared as IIIT Bhagalpur's mentor institute. Pinakeswar Mahanta (director, NIT Arunachal Pradesh), the Dean Faculty Affairs at IITG was the director of IIIT Bhagalapur. Then after Dr. Saurabh Basu (retired), the dean of Outreach Education Program at IIT Guwahati was the director before Professor Arvind Choubey, the permanent director was selected.

=== Emblem ===
The logo of the institute is designed by Mohijeet Das a designer who graduated from the Department of Design, IIT Guwahati. The logo takes inspiration from artifacts closely related to Bhagalpur such as the Vikaramshila Mahavidyalaya, Bhagalpuri saree to name a few.

== Campus ==
The permanent campus of IIIT Bhagalpur has been set up on 50 acres (20 ha) of land near Bhagalpur College of Engineering (BCE), and an initial budget of ₹128.53 crore (US$13 million) was allocated for the construction of the IIIT. The construction of Phase-1 of the permanent campus has been completed. The IIIT building is resistant to earthquakes and floods. The state government had initially identified 100 acres (40 ha) of land in Chandi block, Nalanda district, but could not go ahead with the land acquisition due to protests from land owners. PM Modi inaugurated the new buildings of IIIT in Bhagalpur, Bihar.

=== Temporary campus ===
IIIT Bhagalpur was dedicated to the nation by Prime Minister Shri Narendra Modi on 20 February 2024, at 11:30 AM through online mode. At that time, academic operations were running in a temporary building provided by Bhagalpur College of Engineering (BCE), which had offered space on its campus. The New Boys' Hostel, completed with accommodation for 800 students, was fully equipped with all basic facilities. The new campus is now fully operational and functioning effectively.

== Academics ==
IIIT Bhagalpur offers four B.Tech. courses in Electronics and Communication Engineering, Computer Science Engineering, Mathematics and Computing, and Mechatronics and Automation with an intake capacity of 150 students in computer science engineering 75 in electronics and communication engineering, 27 in Mathematics and Computing and 60 in mechatronics. The institute has started M.Tech. and Ph.D. programs from August 2021.

== M. Tech and Ph.D. (Research) ==
The institute has specialisation in following domains.

CSE	Artificial Intelligence and Data Science
ECE	Signal Processing and Machine Learning
ECE	VLSI and Embedded Systems
ECE	Microwave and Communication Systems
MEA	Electric Vehicle Technology

== Student life ==
The Dining and Recreation center which is also called CAC (Common Activity Center) of the institute contains a student mess and facilities for extra co-curricular activities, such as a music room and a gymnasium.

=== Student council ===
Student Council is a main elected student body that supervises all clubs and festivals. It has a budget which the council distributes to various clubs. Students can form new clubs, based on interests, after formal permission of the student council. The Student Senate is an elected student's body, which focuses on academic many issues like hostels and mess Committee governance are a main part of the units.

=== Student clubs ===
To enhance extra-curricular activities and skills, different clubs have been formed. Student's Council is divided into 3 parts, i.e. Cultural Society, Sports Society, and Technical Society. The Technical Society includes 4 clubs i.e. AI/ML Club, Coding Club, Robotics Club, and Web Development Club. Cultural Society includes 7 clubs: Art and Craft, Dance Club, Dramatics Club, Literature Club, Music and Singing Club, Cinemara, Photography Club(Reflection), and Quiz Club. Sports include Badminton, Volleyball, Cricket, and Athletics. An NGO named "Unnati" is run by students of this college which works for upliftment of unprivileged section of society outside the college campus by providing free education, giving carrier guidance etc.
