= Renu Kushawaha =

Indian politician (born 1962)

Renu Kushwaha

Member of Parliament, Lok Sabha
- In office 1999–2004
- Preceded by: Shakuni Choudhury
- Succeeded by: Rabindra Kumar Rana
- Constituency: Khagaria, Bihar

Minister of Agriculture in the Government of Bihar
- In office 2009–2010

Minister of Industry and Disaster Government of Bihar
- In office 2010–2014

Member of the Bihar Legislative Assembly
- In office 2010–2014
- Constituency: Bihariganj
- In office 2005–2010
- Constituency: Kishanganj

Personal details
- Born: 29 August 1962 (age 64)
- Party: Rashtriya Janata Dal (2025 - present)
- Other political affiliations: Lok Janashakti Party; Bharatiya Janata Party; Janata Dal (United); Samata Party
- Spouse: Vijay Kumar Singh
- Children: 3 daughters
- Education: Patna University

Renu Kushawaha (also called Renu Kumari Singh), an Indian politician from Bihar, is a leader of Rashtriya Janata Dal and a former state minister of Bihar. She hails from Khagaria. She has been associated with several political parties in past, right from Samata Party (now led by Uday Mandal its President) and Janata Dal (United) to Bharatiya Janata Party. In 2015, she contested from Samastipur Assembly seat on a BJP ticket where she lost to RJD candidate.

== Biography ==
Kushawaha was born in Samastipur in 1962. Her husband is Vijay Kumar Singh who is also a politician with allegiance to the Bharatiya Janata Party (BJP).

Kushawaha contested elections for the Bihar State assembly in 2010. She was elected as a Member of the Bihar Legislative Assembly from Bihariganj constituency in Madhepura district. Later, she was made a Cabinet Minister in the Government of Bihar, headed by Nitish Kumar as the Chief Minister. She held the portfolio of Industries and Disaster Management and was the only woman minister in the cabinet. In 2014, her son Vipin Kumar was abducted for a ransom of fifty lakh and was killed some time after the abduction.

== Political career ==
She has been an MLA three times and once an MP in her political life. Not only this, she has also been a cabinet minister twice in the Bihar government led by Nitish Kumar. In the 1999 parliamentary election, Renu Kushwaha of Janata Dal (United) defeated Nayana Rana, wife of Rashtriya Janata Dal veteran RK Rana, by 31,822 votes from Khagaria constituency.

Although Renu lost to RK Rana of RJD in 2004 elections. Earlier in February 2005, Renu defeated RJD strongman and then minister of the state Ravindra Charan Yadav on a JDU ticket from Udkishunganj assembly constituency in Madhepura. Again, Renu Kushwaha won in November 2005 by-election. In 2009, she became the Minister of Agriculture in the Government of Bihar. After this, in 2010, after the delimitation of the new assembly, she contested from Bihariganj. This time also supported by her fortune, Renu defeated Ranjeet Ranjan, wife of veteran Pappu Yadav. She was then made the Minister of Industry and Disaster. But after her husband Vijay Kumar Singh joined BJP in 2014, she resigned from JDU and joined BJP.

In the 2014 Lok Sabha elections, Vijay Kumar Singh contested on BJP's ticket from Madhepura constituency. But he had to taste defeat. In 2019, she resigned from the Bharatiya Janata Party, as she was denied Lok Sabha ticket from Khagaria. Her resignation from JDU to join BJP was necessitated by the fact that earlier, she along with four other legislators were suspended by the JDU for anti-party activities. She later joined Lok Janshakti Party and resigned in April 2024.
