= Habibpur =

- Satellite Town of Bhagalpur City
- Location in Bihar, India Location in India
- Coordinates: 25.21217°N 86.9832°E
- Country: India
- State: Bihar
- Region: Anga
- District: Bhagalpur
- Urban Agglomeration: Bhagalpur Urban Agglomeration

Government
  - Type: Nager panchayat
  - Body: Habibpur Nagar panchayat

Population (2023)
  - Total: 16,400

Language
  - Official: Hindi
  - Additional official: Urdu
  - Regional: Angika
- Time zone: UTC+5:30 (IST)
- Vehicle registration: BR-10
- Lok Sabha constituency: Bhagalpur
- Vidhan Sabha constituency: Nathnagar

Habibpur is a town of Bhagalpur District and lies in the adjoining of Bhagalpur city and part of Bhagalpur Urban Agglomeration in Bhagalpur district in the India state of Anga of Bihar.

== Demographics ==
As of 2011 India census, Habibpur had a population of 16,400. Males constitute 53% of the population and females 47%. Habibpur has an average literacy rate of 85%, lower than the national average of 90.5%: male literacy is 46%, and female literacy is 79.5%. In Habibpur, 10% of the population is under 6 years of age.

== See also ==
- Bhagalpur
- Katihar
- Bhagalpur district
- Cities and towns in Bhagalpur district
