= Murliganj =

Murliganj मुरलीगंज
- Town
- Location in Bihar, India
- Coordinates: 25.9°N 86.98°E
- Country: India
- State: Bihar
- District: Madhepura
- Established: 1957
- Elevation: 52 m (171 ft)

Population (2011)
  - Total: 28,691
- Time zone: UTC+5:30 (IST)
- PIN: 852122
- Lok Sabha constituency: Madhepura
- Vidhan Sabha constituency: Bihariganj

Murliganj is a town and a notified area in Madhepura district in the Indian state of Bihar. PIN code of Murliganj is 852122.

== Geography ==
Murliganj is located at 25.9°N 86.98°E. It has an average elevation of 52 m. It situated on the east boundary of Madhepura.

== Demographics ==
As of 2001 India census, Murliganj had a population of 22,921. Males constitute 53% of the population and females 47%. Murliganj has an average literacy rate of 45%, lower than the national average of 59.5%: male literacy is 53%, and female literacy is 37%. In Murliganj, 19% of the population is under 6 years of age.
