= Jamhore =

- city
- Location in Bihar, India
- Coordinates: 24.84696°N 84.32113°E
- Country: India
- State: Bihar
- District: Aurangabad

Population (2001)
  - Total: 8,575

Languages
  - Official: Magahi, Hindi
- Time zone: UTC+5:30 (IST)
- Postal code: 824121

Jamhore is a village and a notified area in Aurangabad district in the Indian state of Bihar.

According to the 2001 Census of India, Jamhore had a population of 8,575. 52% of the population were male, whilst women accounted for 48%. The village had an average literacy rate of 50%, which was lower than the national average of 59.5% at the time. Male literacy stood at 60% and female literacy at 38%. Approximately 18% of the population was under six years of age.

== See also ==
- Bihar
- Villages in Bihar
- Aurangabad district, Bihar
