= Nohsa =

Bahadurpur
- Census town
- Location in Bihar, India
- Coordinates: 25°33′55″N 85°03′21″E
- Country: India
- State: Bihar
- Division: Patna
- District: Patna
- Region: Magadha
- UA: Patna

Government
  - Type: Gram Panchayat
  - Body: Bahadurpur Gram Panchayat

Languages
  - Spoken: Magadhi, Hindi
- Time zone: UTC+5:30 (IST)
- PIN: 801505
- Telephone code: 0612
- ISO 3166 code: IN-BR
- Vehicle registration: BR-01
- Website: patna.bih.nic.in

Bahadurpur is a census town and Gram Panchayat in Phulwari Sharif, Patna in Bihar state of India. It is a part of Patna urban agglomeration. Comes under Phulwari Assembly Constituency and Patliputra Parliamentary Constituency. It is connected to NH-139 via Nohsa road. Nohsa Road has large number of apartments on both side of the road.The current planned route map of Patna metro has one station to Nohsa.

Situated in Phulwari Sharif Block. Distance from Patna is around 10 Km and from AIIMS Patna is about 2 Km.

== Transport ==
Phulwari Sharif railway station and Danapur railway station are the nearby Railway Stations, which connects to many Metropolitan cities of India by the Howrah-Delhi Main Line. It is connected to major cities of India via NH139.

Nearest Airport is Jay Prakash Narayan Airport situated at a distance of 7 km.
