= Barari Behta =

Village in Bihar, eastern India

Barari Behta is a small village in the district of Sitamarhi, Bihar, India. It has three panchayats: Barari, Behta, and Balsa.
