= Barari (surname) =

Barari (Persian: براری) is a surname. Notable people with the surname include:

- Esmael Barari, Iranian filmmaker
- Hari Anand Barari (1929–2016), Indian Intelligence Bureau officer
- Mohammad Reza Barari (born 1988), Iranian weightlifter
