= Saidpura =

- census town
- Location in Bihar, India
- Coordinates: 25°36′51″N 85°10′0″E
- Country: India
- State: Bihar
- UA: Patna
- Elevation: 55 m (180 ft)

Population (2011)
  - Total: 7,392

Languages
  - Spoken: Magadhi, Hindi
- Time zone: UTC+5:30 (IST)
- PIN: 800006
- Vehicle registration: BR-01

Saidpura or Saidpur is a census town in the Indian state of Bihar. It is a part of Patna urban agglomeration.

== Demographics ==
As of 2011 India census, Saidpura had a population of 7,392 of which 3,900 are males while 3,492 are females. 14.92% of the population was under six years of age. The sex ratio of 918 females per 1,000 males was lower than the national average of 944. The data on religion in 2011 showed Hinduism as the majority religion with 98.88% followers. The overall literacy rate is 75.47%, with the male literacy rate being 82.29% and the female literacy rate being 67.81%.
