= Akbarnagar, Bihar =

Town in Bihar, India

Akbarnagar
- town
- Location within Bihar Location within India
- Coordinates: 25°14′09″N 86°50′32″E
- Country: India
- State: Bihar
- District: Bhagalpur
- Block: Sultanganj

Government
  - Type: Nagar panchayat

Area
  - Total: 8 km^{2} (3.1 sq mi)
- Elevation: 40 m (130 ft)

Population (2011)
  - Total: 12,000
  - Density: 1,500/km^{2} (3,900/sq mi)

Languages
  - Local: Angika
- Time zone: UTC+5:30 (IST)
- PIN: 812006
- STD code: 0641
- Vehicle registration: BR-10

Akbarnagar is a town in the Sultanganj block of Bhagalpur district in Bihar, India. It is situated on the southern part of the district, about 14 kilometres west of the district headquarter Bhagalpur. In the year 2011, the town had a population of 12000.

== Geography ==
Akbarnagar is located at the southern bank of the Ganges River. It is bounded by Maheshi to its west, Ahmadpur Sahar to its north, Hario to its east, and Gauripur Chaur to its south. The total geographical area of village is 2070 hectares.

== Demographics ==
As per the 2011 Census of India, the village of Akbarnagar had 31,773 registered inhabitants in 5,384 households. Of the local population, 16,767 were male and 15,006 were female. The working population formed 28.52% of the total population. Average literacy rate of Akbarnagar was 56.71%, of which 10,553 of the male residents and 7,464 of the female residents being literate.
