= Sabour, Bhagalpur =

Town in Bihar, India

Sabour
- Satellite Town of Bhagalpur City
- Location in Bihar, India Location in India
- Coordinates: 25.2442°N 87.0452°E
- Country: India
- State: Bihar
- Region: Anga
- District: Bhagalpur
- Urban Agglomeration: Bhagalpur Urban Agglomeration

Government
  - Type: Nager panchayat
  - Body: Sabour Nagar panchayat

Population (2011)
  - Total: 12,575

Language
  - Official: Hindi
  - Additional official: Urdu
  - Regional: Angika
- Time zone: UTC+5:30 (IST)
- Vehicle registration: BR-10
- Lok Sabha constituency: Bhagalpur
- Vidhan Sabha constituency: Nathnagar

Sabour is an adjoining town of Bhagalpur city and headquarter of Sabour block in Bhagalpur district in the Indian state of Bihar.

== Climate ==
Climate data for Sabour (1991-2020)
Month	Jan	Feb	Mar	Apr	May	Jun	Jul	Aug	Sep	Oct	Nov	Dec	Year
Record high °C (°F)	29.8 (85.6)	34.0 (93.2)	40.6 (105.1)	44.0 (111.2)	45.1 (113.2)	46.1 (115.0)	39.2 (102.6)	37.4 (99.3)	38.0 (100.4)	36.0 (96.8)	33.4 (92.1)	29.4 (84.9)	46.1 (115.0)
Mean daily maximum °C (°F)	21.4 (70.5)	25.6 (78.1)	31.3 (88.3)	35.7 (96.3)	36.3 (97.3)	34.5 (94.1)	32.8 (91.0)	32.7 (90.9)	32.0 (89.6)	31.2 (88.2)	28.6 (83.5)	23.9 (75.0)	30.6 (87.1)
Mean daily minimum °C (°F)	7.9 (46.2)	11.2 (52.2)	15.7 (60.3)	21.1 (70.0)	24.2 (75.6)	25.7 (78.3)	25.8 (78.4)	26.2 (79.2)	25.2 (77.4)	22.1 (71.8)	15.7 (60.3)	9.8 (49.6)	19.4 (66.9)
Record low °C (°F)	0.6 (33.1)	2.0 (35.6)	3.9 (39.0)	9.7 (49.5)	16.1 (61.0)	19.4 (66.9)	20.7 (69.3)	20.7 (69.3)	19.7 (67.5)	12.6 (54.7)	5.0 (41.0)	2.2 (36.0)	0.6 (33.1)
Average rainfall mm (inches)	12.4 (0.49)	11.4 (0.45)	10.9 (0.43)	28.8 (1.13)	96.1 (3.78)	171.5 (6.75)	300.7 (11.84)	268.5 (10.57)	215.7 (8.49)	79.6 (3.13)	5.1 (0.20)	5.9 (0.23)	1,206.6 (47.50)
Average rainy days	1.0	1.2	1.1	2.0	5.0	8.4	13.9	12.2	9.3	3.5	0.5	0.4	58.5
Average relative humidity (%) (at 17:30 IST)	65	56	47	46	56	71	81	81	81	75	66	64	66
Source: India Meteorological Department

== Education ==
- Bihar Agricultural University
- Bhagalpur College of Engineering
- Indian Institute of Information Technology, Bhagalpur
- Sabour college
