= Singhia, Samastipur =

Village in Bihar, India

Singhia
- Village
- Location within Bihar Location within India
- Coordinates: 25°50′28″N 86°09′38″E
- Country: India
- State: Bihar
- District: Samastipur
- Block: Singhia

Government
  - Type: Sarpanch

Area
  - Total: 18.02 km^{2} (6.96 sq mi)
- Elevation: 42 m (138 ft)

Population (2011)
  - Total: 31,952
  - Density: 1,773/km^{2} (4,592/sq mi)

Languages
  - Common: Maithili, Hindi
- Time zone: UTC+5:30 (IST)
- PIN: 848209
- STD code: 06274
- Vehicle registration: BR-33

Singhia is a village in Samastipur District of Bihar, India. It is located on the northern edge of Samastipur District. As of 2011 census, it had 31,952 residents.

== Geography ==
Singhia is located to the north of Bagmati River, with the State Highway 88 running through the village. It has an average elevation of 42 metres (138 ft). The village occupies an area of 1802 hectares.

== Demographics ==
As per the 2011 India Census, the population of Singhia was 31,952. Males constituted 52.62% of the population and females 47.38%. Working population made up 29.33% of the population. Singhia had an average literacy rate of 42.5%, with 51.11% of the male inhabitants and 32.95% of the female inhabitants being literate.
