= Bihariganj =

- Town
- Location in Bihar, India Bihariganj (India)
- Coordinates: 25°44′09″N 86°58′45″E
- Country: India
- State: Bihar
- District: Madhepura
- Elevation: 46 m (151 ft)

Languages
  - Official: Maithili, Hindi
- Time zone: UTC+5:30 (IST)
- Postal code: 852101
- ISO 3166 code: IN-BR
- Nearest city: Saharsa, Madhepura, Purnia
- Lok Sabha constituency: Madhepura
- Vidhan Sabha constituency: Bihariganj
- Website: madhepura.bih.nic.in

Bihariganj is a city in the Madhepura district of Bihar, India. Bihariganj is located in Northeast India and is part of the Mithila region.

== History ==
The ancient name of Bihariganj was "Nishankhpur Kodha". In medieval times, Bihariganj was ruled by the Sen dynasty. In the 16th century, the main stream of the Koshi River flowed to Bihariganj, named "ha-ha dhar", with a small market approximately 2 kilometers away. Gamail Gola was used as a local market where jute, rice, wheat, and other commercial items were purchased and bought by local people. Bihariganj Railway station is one of the oldest railway stations in northern India.

== Geography ==
Bihariganj is the central market of its surrounded villages. It is surrounded by villages like Rajghat, Gangaura, Rajganj, Madhukarchak, Mohanpur, Laxmipur, Belahi, Babhangama, Tulsia, Baijnathpur, Vishanpur, Gamail, Mahikhand, Madhuvan Tintenga, and others. There are several chauk (zebra crossing) such as Panchwati Chauk, Jawahar Chauk, Shastri Chauk, Viswkarma Chauk, Gandhi Chauk, Mahavir chauk, Subhash Chauk, and Babhangama Chauk. Bihariganj is a block in Madhepura district. It belongs to the Kosi division. It is located 41 kilometres (25 mi) southeast from Madhepura, the district headquarters.

== Demographics ==
In the 2011 census, the total population of Bihariganj was 135,534, out of which 52% were male and 48% female. Based on population, Bihariganj was 7th in Madhepura district and 374th in Bihar. The town had a total of 27,870 households spread across 25 villages and 12 panchayats. Most of the area is rural except for the suburbs of the main town.

It has a literacy ratio of 58% with 61,527 total people literate. In terms of literacy, Bihariganj ranks at 1st in the Madhepura district and ranked 357th in Bihar.

Maithili is the local language. Hindi and Urdu is also spoken.

According to the Planning Commission of India, the poverty headcount ratio is 19.83% in Bihariganj.

=== Employment ===
Bihariganj has a total of 48,905 people employed. Out of total employed people, 32,914 are male and 15,991 are female. The employment ratio is 36%. Bihariganj stands at 11th in Madhepura district and ranked 159th in Bihar.

== Economy ==
This town has many textile businesses. It also produces jute and sugar. People are dependent mainly on business and agriculture.

=== Agriculture ===
Food crops include paddy and wheat. Other crops include corn, mango, sugarcane, sunflower, mustard, jack fruits, banana, and seasonal Indian vegetables.

== Culture ==
Ramnavmi Yatra is famous in Bihariganj. There are many temples such as the Chandika Temple, Durga Temple, Hanuman temple, and Shiva Temple. It is a mainly Mithila-oriented society.

== Educational institutions ==
=== Colleges ===
- Bhola Paswan Shastri Degree College Babhangama Bihariganj Madhepura(B P S Degree College Babhangama Madhepura)
- Bhatu Shah College
- Yashoda Sitaram College
- Garib Chandra College
- Hansi Mandal Inter College
- High School Bihariganj
- Bhola Paswan Shastri College Babhangama Bihariganj Madhepura[B P S College Babhangama Madhepura)
- K ॰ K ॰ P ॰ K High School Babhangama Bihariganj Madhepura[NIOS]
- Lal Bahadur Shastri Sanskrit High School Babhangama Bihariganj Madhepura[L॰ B॰ S॰ SNK High School Babhangama Bihariganj Madhepura[Sanskrit Board 10th Govt of Bihar]

=== Schools ===
- Bhola Paswan Shastri College Babhangama Bihariganj Madhepura(BPS College Babhangama Madhepura)
- Sharda Vidya Mandir school Shastri chowk bihariganj
- New Modern Public School
- C.D. Saraswati Shishu Mandir
- Saraswati Vidya Mandir
- Mithila Public School
- Gandhi Gyan Mandir Babhangama Bihariganj Madhepura
- Arya Samaj Babhangama Bihariganj Madhepura
- Real Modern Public School
- St. Michal School
- Middle School Bihariganj
- High School Bihariganj
- Gayatri Jhawar Kanya Middle school
- Gayatri Jhawar Kanya High school
- Baal Vikash Aawasiya School
- Bhatu Shah High School
- St. Xavier school
- Bhola Paswan Shastri Degree College Babhangama Bihariganj Madhepura(B.P.S Degree College Babhangama Bihariganj Madhepura)PRINCIPAL- Atulesh Verma (Babul Jee) Con No.9934024657,8789680104
- K.K.P.K High School Babhangama Bihariganj Madhepura[NIOS] Coordinator-Atulesh Verma (Babul jee) Con No. 9934024657,8789680104
- Lal Bahadur Shastri Sanskrit School Babhangama Bihariganj Madhepura(L.B.S.SNK School Babhangama Bihariganj Madhepura)

== See also ==
- Bihariganj (Community development block)
- Bihariganj (Vidhan Sabha constituency)
- Madhepura
- Barauni-Katihar section (railway line)
