= Chandi, Bihar =

Town in Nalanda, Bihar, India

Coordinates: 25°19′40.38″N 85°24′14.47″E

Chandi is a small town in Nalanda, Bihar state, India. The town is located in Chandi Tehsil of Nalanda District in the Indian state of Bihar. It is 17.3 km distance from the District's main city Bihar Sharif and 42 km from the state's main city Patna.

== Education ==
The government has established Nalanda College of Engineering.
