= Bhagalpur College of Engineering =

Government engineering college in Bhagalpur, Bihar

- Other name: BCE
- Motto: योगः कर्मसु कौशलम् (Sanskrit)
- Type: Public college
- Established: 1960 (66 years ago)
- Academic affiliations: Bihar Engineering University
- Principal: Dr. Raju M. Tugnayat
- Undergraduates: 1200+
- Location: Sabour, Bhagalpur, Bihar, India
- Campus: Urban, 230 acres (930,000 m^{2})
- Colors: Brown and Pink
- Website: www.bcebhagalpur.ac.in

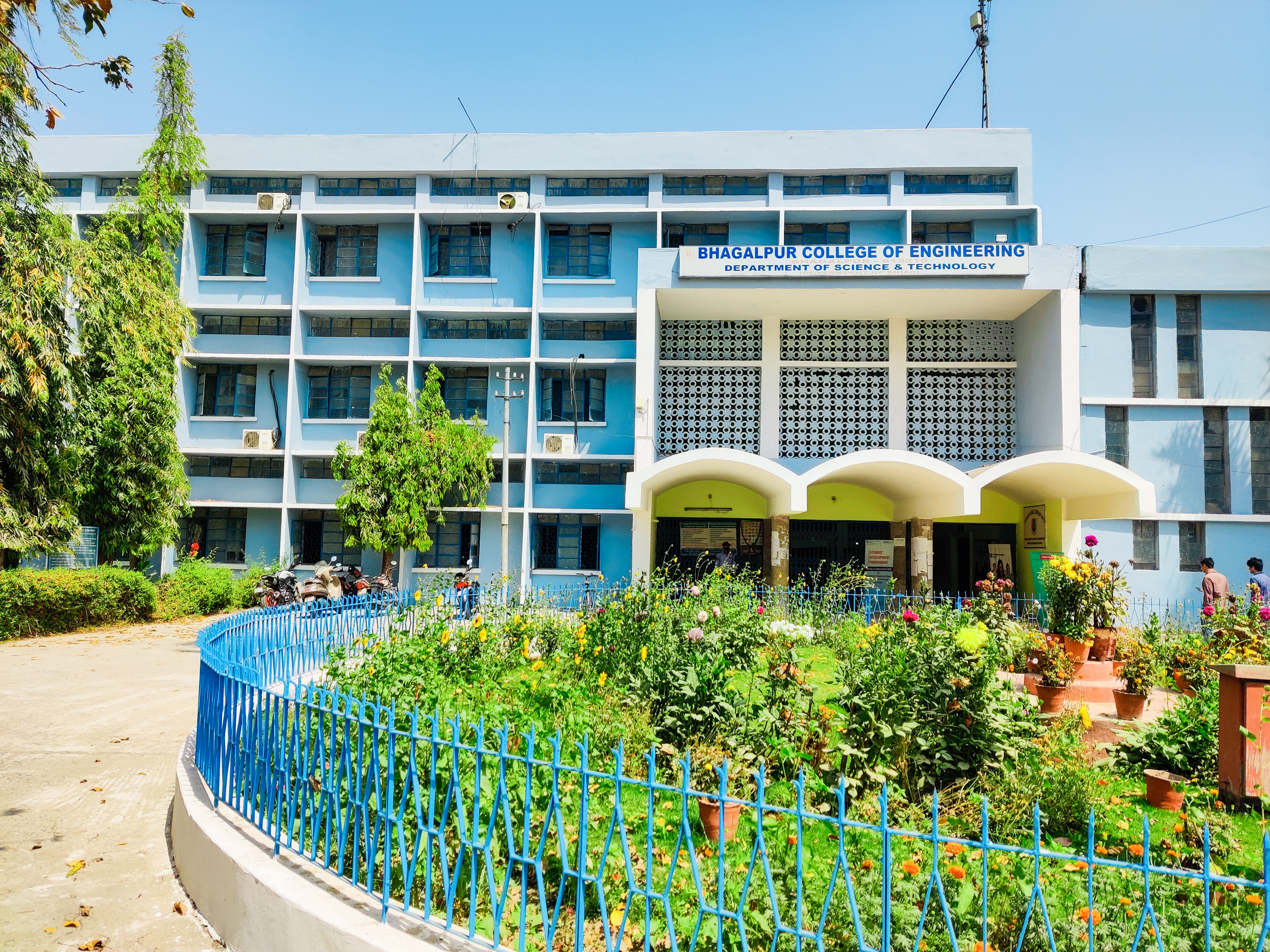

Bhagalpur College of Engineering (BCE Bhagalpur) is one of the best State Government Technical Institution and was established in 1960 in Bhagalpur, Bihar, India. This institute offers full-time Bachelor of Technology (B.Tech.) degree programs. It is administered by the Department of Science and Technology, Bihar. The college is affiliated with Bihar Engineering University

== History ==
The college was set up by the Department of Science and Technology, Government of Bihar in the year 1960. Earlier, the affiliation was under Tilkamanjhi Bhagalpur University. In 2008, after the establishment of Aryabhatta Knowledge University, affiliation of the college is transferred to this university. After 15 March 2023, the affiliation was transferred to Bihar Engineering University.

== Admission ==
=== UG admission ===
Earlier, undergraduate admissions were done through the BCECE conducted by Bihar Combined Entrance Competitive Examination Board. From 2019 and onwards admissions is taken through UGEAC based on rank list of JEE Main conducted by National Testing Agency.

=== PG admission ===
Admission in M.Tech is done on the basis of GATE score through PGEAC.

== Academic departments ==
BCE Bhagalpur has nine academic departments"

- Department of Civil Engineering
- Department of Computer Science and Engineering
- Department of Electrical Engineering
- Department of Electronics and Communication Engineering
- Department of Mechanical Engineering
- Department of Physics
- Department of Chemistry
- Department of Mathematics
- Department of Humanities

== Degree programs ==
College conducts educational programs leading to the degree of Bachelor of Technology (B.Tech.) in following branches each with capacity of 63 students and Master of Technology (M.Tech.) in Mechanical Engineering (total 36 seats in the specializations of Thermal Engineering and Manufacturing), M.Tech. in Electrical Engineering (total 18 seats in the specialization of Power System) and M.Tech. in ECE (total 30 seats in the specialization of Microelectronics and VLSI Design)

- Civil Engineering
- Computer Science and Engineering
- Electrical Engineering
- Electronics and Communication Engineering
- Mechanical Engineering.

== Student life ==
=== Computer center ===
Bhagalpur College of Engineering (BCE) operates a centralized computer center that serves students and faculty. Housed in a dedicated facility, the center includes specialized laboratories for undergraduate students and features approximately 250 computers connected via a local area network (LAN) across two floors, providing internet access and programming facilities to departments including Civil, Mechanical, Electronics and Communication, Electrical, and Computer Science and Engineering.

=== Digital library ===
Digital library also known as digital repository is an online database having digital objects in different formats such as text, audio, video, images, etc. Digital library provides access to multiple users at time and requires very little space. The information retrieval is quite easy. Bhagalpur College of Engineering provides the access for both the students and Faculties. The digital platform offers around 3000 online courses. The students and faculties can interact on the online portal and faculties can upload their self taught lectures on the platform. The digital library is hosted both on the online portal and on the Android app. Online portal link: bec.skylearning.in

=== Hostels ===
BCE, Bhagalpur provides hostel facilities to boys & girls. It has 7 Boys' hostels and 2 Girls' hostels.

=== Medical facilities ===
The college provides medical facilities and health education program for students. The college invites a registered medical practitioner from time to time to examine the student's health.

=== Sports ===
College has playground for various sports like Volleyball, Cricket. It also has indoor stadium for Badminton and table tennis. Previously it has also gym facilities.But currently there is no gym facilities.

=== College fests ===
Bhagalpur College of Engineering organizes Technoriti as its annual festival every year from 2012. Started with the name AAGHAZ the festival comprises Parakram the annual Sports meet, Umang the Cultural festival and technical fest. Later in 2013, the name aagaz was changed to Technoriti by the student organization which additionally included Sangam as the Alumni meet of BCE Bhagalpur.
