= State Board of Technical Education, Bihar =

Technical diploma exam conducting board of Bihar, India

- Abbreviation: SBTE, Bihar
- Nickname: SBTE
- Formation: 31 May 1955; 70 years ago
- Chairman: Sumit Kumar Singh
- Website: https://sbte.bihar.gov.in/

State Board of Technical Education, Bihar (SBTE, Bihar) is a governing body for polytechnic institutes in Bihar state of India. It is constituted under department of science technology and technical education department, Government of Bihar for the purpose of examination and certification of six semester or three years diploma courses in Polytechnic institutions.

== History ==
The board was constituted by Bihar government order number 75/Dir dated 31 May 1955 under the Department of Science & Technology, Government of Bihar.

== Affiliated Government Institutes ==
List of Government Polytechnic Institutes in Bihar
S.No.	Name of Institute	Institute Code	Abbreviation
1	Government Polytechnic, Barauni	111	GP Barauni
2	Government Polytechnic, Bhagalpur	112	GP Bhagalpur
3	Government Polytechnic, Chapra	113	GP Chhapra
4	Government Polytechnic, Darbhanga	114	GP Darbhanga
5	Government Polytechnic, Gaya	115	GP Gaya
6	Government Polytechnic, Gopalganj	116	GP Gopalganj
7	Government Polytechnic, Muzaffarpur	117	GP Muzaffarpur
8	Government Polytechnic, Patna - 7	118	GP Patna-7
9	Government Polytechnic, Purnea	119	GP Purnea
10	Government Polytechnic, Saharsa	120	GP Saharsa
11	New Government Polytechnic, Patna - 13	121	NGP Patna-13
12	Government Women's Polytechnic, Muzaffarpur	122	GWP Muzaffarpur
13	Government Women's Polytechnic, Patna	123	GWP Patna
14	Government Polytechnic, Katihar	124	GP Katihar
15	Government Polytechnic, Vaishali	125	GP Vaishali
16	Government Polytechnic, Lakhisarai	126	GP Lakhisarai
17	Government Polytechnic, Dehrionsone	127	GP Dehrionsone
18	Government Polytechnic, Asthawan, Nalanda	128	GP Asthawan, Nalanda
19	Government Polytechnic, Sheohar	129	GP Sheohar
20	Government Polytechnic, Motihari	130	GP Motihari
21	Government Polytechnic, Madhubani	131	GP Madhubani
22	Baddiuzama Khan Polytechnic Institute, Sitamarhi	132	BKPI Sitamarhi
23	Government Polytechnic, Madhepura	133	GP Madhepura
24	Government Polytechnic, Raghopur, Supaul	134	GP Raghopur, Supaul
25	Kameshwar Narayan Singh Government Polytechnic, Samastipur	135	KNSGP Samastipur
26	Braj Kishor Narayan Singh Government Polytechnic, Gopalganj	136	BKNSGP Gopalganj
27	Government Polytechnic, Munger	137	GP Munger
28	Government Polytechnic, Sheikhpura	138	GP Sheikhpura
29	Government Polytechnic, Jamui	139	GP Jamui
30	Government Polytechnic, Banka	140	GP Banka
31	Government Polytechnic, Tekari, Gaya	141	GP Tekari, Gaya
32	Government Polytechnic, Kaimur	142	GP Kaimur
33	Government Polytechnic, Buxar	143	GP Buxar
34	Government Polytechnic, Sitamarhi	144	GP Sitamarhi
35	Government Polytechnic, West Champaran	145	GP West Champaran
36	Government Polytechnic, Kishanganj	146	GP Kishanganj
37	Government Polytechnic, Araria	147	GP Araria
38	Government Polytechnic, Nawada	148	GP Nawada
39	Government Polytechnic, Siwan	149	GP Siwan
40	Government Polytechnic, Arwal	150	GP Arwal
41	Government Polytechnic, Aurangabad	151	GP Aurangabad
42	Government Polytechnic, Bhojpur	152	GP Bhojpur
43	Government Polytechnic, Jehanabad	153	GP Jehanabad
44	Government Polytechnic, Khagaria	154	GP Khagaria
45	Government Polytechnic, Barh	155	GP Barh
46	Government Textile Technology Institute, Bhagalpur	156	GPTT Bhagalpur

== Affiliated Private Institutes ==
List of Private Polytechnic Institutes in Bihar
Sl. No.	Institute Name	Code	District
1	Azmet College of Engineering and Technology, Kishanganj	172	Kishanganj
2	Millia Polytechnic, Purnea	173	Purnea
3	Buddha Institute of Technology, Gaya	174	Gaya
4	Buddha Polytechnic Institute, Gaya	175	Gaya
5	K. K. Polytechnic, Nalanda	176	Nalanda
6	Patna Sahib Technical Campus, Vaishali	177	Vaishali
7	Sityog Institute of Technology, Aurangabad	178	Aurangabad
8	Shri Ram Polytechnic, Madhubani	179	Madhubani
9	Buddha Institute of Technology, Gaya (2nd Shift)	180	Gaya
10	Buddha Polytechnic Institute, Gaya (2nd Shift)	181	Gaya
11	K. K. Polytechnic, Nalanda (2nd Shift)	182	Nalanda
12	Patna Sahib Technical Campus, Vaishali (2nd Shift)	183	Vaishali
13	K.K. College of Engineering & Management, Nalanda (2nd Shift)	184	Nalanda
14	C. R. K. Polytechnic, Hajipur	185	Vaishali
15	Netaji Subhash Institute of Technology, Bihta	187	Patna
16	Ganga Memorial College of Polytechnic, Harnaut	188	Nalanda
17	Netaji Subhas Institute of Polytechnic, Bihta	189	Patna
18	Exalt College of Polytechnic, Vaishali	190	Vaishali
19	R.P. Sharma Institute of Technology, Danapur, Patna	191	Patna
20	Prabhu Kailash Polytechnic, Aurangabad	192	Aurangabad
21	Millia Institute of Technology, Rambagh, Purnea	193	Purnea
22	Azmet Institute of Technology, Kishanganj (2nd Shift)	194	Kishanganj
23	Millia Polytechnic, Veriadangi, Kishanganj	195	Kishanganj
24	Satyam International Institute of Technology, Gaurichak, Patna	197	Patna
25	J.P. Institute of Technology, Biharsharif, Nalanda	198	Nalanda
26	GEMS Polytechnic College, Aurangabad	199	Aurangabad
27	Girija Devi Polytechnic College, Bihiya, Bhojpur	200	Bhojpur
28	Jamui Polytechnic, Jamui	201	Jamui
29	Buddha Polytechnic, Lalganj, Vaishali	202	Vaishali
30	Hi Tech Polytechnic College, Bettiah	203	West Champaran
31	Chanakya Institute of Polytechnic and Technology, Koilwar, Bhojpur	204	Bhojpur
32	Aryabhatt Polytechnic, Gaya	205	Gaya
33	Mothers Institute of Technology, Bihta	206	Patna
34	Jamui Institute of Technology, Jamui	207	Jamui
35	Mamta Institute of Education, Siwan	208	Siwan
36	Maalik Institute of Technology, Gaya	209	Gaya
37	Maulana Azad College of Engineering & Technology, Neora, Patna	210	Patna
38	MPS Polytechnic College, Muzaffarpur	211	Muzaffarpur
39	Muzaffarpur College of Professional Education, Muzaffarpur	212	Muzaffarpur
40	Rajeev College of Professional Education, Sitamarhi	213	Sitamarhi
41	Subhash Institute of Technology, Jamui	214	Jamui
42	SNS Vidyapeeth, Motihari	215	East Champaran
43	Champaran Group of Institutions, West Champaran	216	West Champaran
44	Maharana Pratap Institute of Technology, Buxar	217	Buxar
45	Maa Kamakhya Polytechnic, Ramdihra, Rohtas	218	Rohtas
46	RIMU Institute of Technology, Pant Nagar, Gaya	219	Gaya
47	Lichavi Institute of Professional Studies, Muzaffarpur	220	Muzaffarpur
48	Magadh Institute of Technology, Nasriganj, Patna	221	Patna
49	Champaran College of Professional Education, East Champaran	222	East Champaran
50	Dr. Ashok Gagan College, Bihta, Patna	223	Patna
51	Sityog Institute of Polytechnic, Aurangabad	224	Aurangabad
52	Arjun College of Technical Education, Naugachia, Bhagalpur	225	Bhagalpur
53	Champaran College, Bagha, Champaran	226	West Champaran
54	Divine Institute of Technology, Siwan	227	Siwan
55	Ekalavya Institute of Higher Education, Madhepura	228	Madhepura
56	Himalaya Institute of Technology, Ebrahimpur, Awadhara, Patna	229	Patna
57	Kanhaiya Memorial College of Higher Education, Gaya	230	Gaya
58	Kinesis Institute of Technology, Masaurhi, Patna	231	Patna
59	Kusumraj Educational Institution, Bikram, Patna	232	Patna
60	Maa Kanti College of Higher Education, Fatwah, Patna	233	Patna
61	Rungta Institute of Technology and Management, Forbesganj, Araria	234	Araria
62	Vidya Education Group, Masaurhi, Patna	235	Patna
63	Vivekanand Institute of Technology, Naubatpur, Patna	236	Patna
