= Bhagalpur district =

District in Bihar, India

- District of Bihar
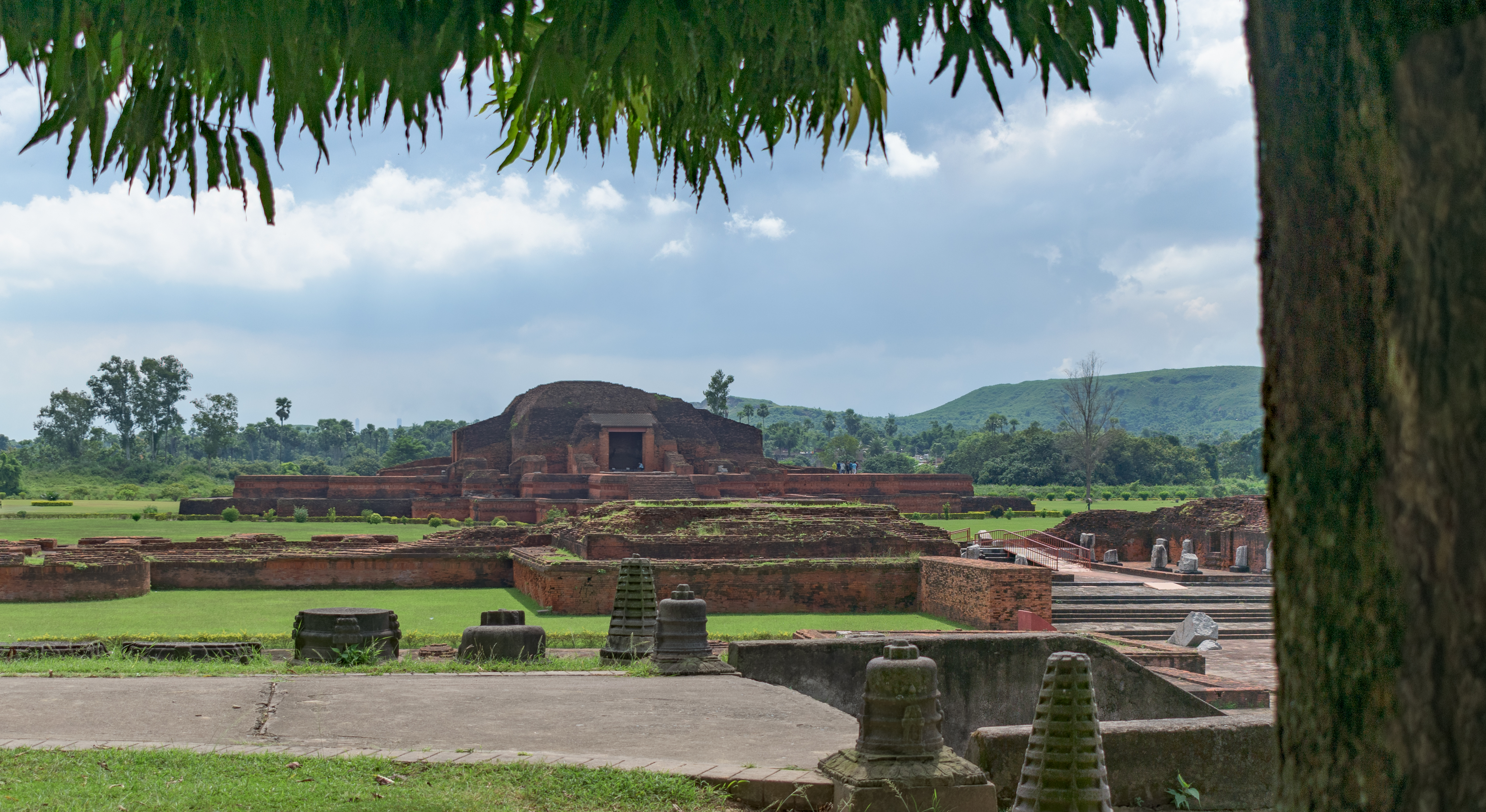
- An image of the Vikramshila ancient university
- Interactive map of Bhagalpur district
- Coordinates (Bhagalpur): 25°14′40″N 86°58′19″E
- Country: India
- State: Bihar
- Division: Bhagalpur
- Established: 1765
- Headquarters: Bhagalpur

Government
  - Lok Sabha constituencies: Bhagalpur; Banka (for Sultanganj and Shahkund Blocks)
  - Vidhan Sabha constituencies: Bhagalpur; Nathnagar; Pirpainti; Kahalgaon; Sultanganj; Bihpur; Gopalpur

Area
  - Total: 2,569 km^{2} (992 sq mi)

Population (2011)
  - Total: 3,037,766
  - Density: 1,182/km^{2} (3,063/sq mi)
  - Urban: 602,532

Demographics
  - Literacy: 63.14 per cent
  - Sex ratio: 880/1000
- Time zone: UTC+05:30 (IST)
- Major highways: NH 33, NH 31, NH 80
- Average annual precipitation: 1166 mm
- Website: bhagalpur.nic.in

Bhagalpur district (/ˈbɑːɡəlpʊər/) is one of the thirty-eight districts of the Indian state of Bihar, located in the southeastern region, with its administrative headquarters in the city of Bhagalpur. It is one of the oldest districts of Bihar. It is a part of Bhagalpur Division.

== Geography ==
Bhagalpur district occupies an area of 2,569 square kilometres (992 sq mi). Located on the Ganga Plain, district is bounded to the north by Madhepura, Katihar, and Purnia districts, to the east by Jharkhand state, to the west by Khagaria district, and to the south by Banka district. The Ganga River flows through the district and its alluvial soil supports agriculture, with major crops including rice, wheat, corn, barley and sugarcane.

=== National protected area ===
- Vikramshila Gangetic Dolphin Sanctuary

== Demographics ==
Historical population
Year	Pop.	±%
1901	599,746	—
1911	609,927	+1.7%
1921	569,075	−6.7%
1931	655,803	+15.2%
1941	749,465	+14.3%
1951	841,309	+12.3%
1961	1,022,322	+21.5%
1971	1,250,354	+22.3%
1981	1,582,753	+26.6%
1991	1,909,967	+20.7%
2001	2,423,172	+26.9%
2011	3,037,766	+25.4%

=== Religion ===
By C.D. Block

CD block	Hinduism	Islam	Others
Naugachhia	89.75%	10.05%	0.20%
Gopalpur	93.75%	6.25%	0.10%
Ismailpur	96.23%	3.5%	0.43%
Bihpur	81.66%	17.98%	0.35%
Rangrachowk	89.64%	9.91%	0.45%
Jagdishpur	65.29%	33.92%	0.79%
Sanhaula	72.82%	26.6%	0.57%
Sabour	82.33%	17.47%	0.19%
Goradih	79.05%	20.40%	0.55%
Narayanpur	88.16%	11.69%	0.13%
Kahalgaon	89.61%	10.16%	0.33%
Sultanganj	90.17%	9.47%	0.46%
Pirpainti	82.86%	16.55%	0.59%
Kharik	87.26%	12.57%	0.17%
Shahkund	83.24%	16.35%	0.41%
Nathnagar	90.70%	9.17%	0.13%

Religions in Bhagalpur district (2011)
Religion	Percent
Hinduism	81.90%
Islam	17.68%
Other or not stated	0.42%

According to the 2011 census Bhagalpur district has a population of 3,037,766. This gives it a ranking of 120th in India (out of a total of 640). The district has a population density of 1,182 inhabitants per square kilometre (3,060/sq mi). Its population growth rate over the decade 2001–2011 was 25.36%. Bhagalpur has a sex ratio of 880 females for every 1000 males, and a literacy rate of 63.14%. 19.83% of the population lives in urban areas. Scheduled Castes and Scheduled Tribes made up 10.49% and 2.21% of the population respectively.

=== Languages ===
Languages of Bhagalpur district (2011)
1. 'Other' Hindi (62.9%)
2. Hindi (23.4%)
3. Urdu (10.3%)
4. Bhojpuri (2.09%)
5. Bengali (1.28%)

At the time of the 2011 Census of India, 23.40% of the population in the district spoke Hindi, 10.29% Urdu and 2.09% Bhojpuri as their first language. 62.94% of the population spoke languages classified as 'Others' under Hindi on the census.

The primary language used in the district is Angika. Other chief languages include Hindi, Urdu and Bengali language.

== Politics ==
District	No.	Constituency	Name	Party	Alliance	Remarks
Bhagalpur	152	Bihpur	Kumar Shailendra	BJP	NDA	
Bhagalpur	153	Gopalpur	Shailesh Kumar Mandal	JD(U)	NDA	
Bhagalpur	154	Pirpainti (SC)	Murari Paswan	BJP	NDA	
Bhagalpur	155	Kahalgaon	Shubhanand Mukesh	JD(U)	NDA	
Bhagalpur	156	Bhagalpur	Rohit Pandey	BJP	NDA	
Bhagalpur	157	Sultanganj	Lalit Narayan Mandal	JD(U)	NDA	
Bhagalpur	158	Nathnagar	Mithun Yadav	LJP(RV)	NDA	

== Economy ==
In 2006 the Indian government named Bhagalpur one of the country's 250 Rank 3 backward districts (out of a total of 640). It is one of the 38 districts in Bihar currently receiving funds from the Backward Regions Grant Fund Programme (BRGF).

A 1320MW Thermal Power Plant is going to establish at Pirapinti with a J.V of NHPC, Bihar State Power Generation Company (BSPGCL) and Nalanda Power Company, a subsidiary of RPG Groups.

According to the Geological Survey of India, the coal reserve of 1366.75 metric ton has been discovered in Srinagar, Laxmipur, Mandar and Pirpainti block of Bhagalpur district. Bharat Coking Coal Limited is to start mining operations as of September 2019.

== Education ==
The district was home to Vikramashila, a Buddhist mahavihara and centre of learning excavated at the village of Antichak, about 50 km (31 mi) east of Bhagalpur. It was founded by the Pala king Dharmapala, who ruled from 770 to 810.

Tilka Manjhi Bhagalpur University was established on 12 July 1960 as Bhagalpur University, initially with local colleges previously associated with Patna University. It took its present name in 1991. Bihar Agricultural University at Sabour was established as an autonomous university on 5 August 2010. Its Bihar Agricultural College dates to 1908, when the foundation stone of the Bengal Provincial Agricultural College was laid at Sabour. The Indian Institute of Information Technology, Bhagalpur began functioning in the 2017 academic year and now runs from a permanent campus at Sabour. It was set up under a public–private partnership as a joint venture of the Government of India, the Government of Bihar and BELTRON.

=== Autonomous institutions ===
- Indian Institute of Information Technology, Bhagalpur

=== Engineering College ===
- Bhagalpur College of Engineering
- Indian Institute of Information Technology, Bhagalpur

=== University ===
- Bihar Agricultural University
- Tilka Manjhi Bhagalpur University

=== Agriculture college ===
Bihar Agriculture College, Sabour

=== General Colleges ===
- T.N.B. College, Bhagalpur
- Marwari College, Bhagalpur
- Sunderwati Mahila College, Bhagalpur
- Murarka College, Sultanganj
- Jay Prakash College, Narayanpur

=== Polytechnic College ===
- Government Polytechnic, Bhagalpur

=== Schools ===
- Mount Assisi School
- St. Joseph's School
- Mount Carmel School

== Flora and fauna ==
=== Flora ===
The floodplains of the Ganga and Kosi rivers shape much of the vegetation. Trees and plants commonly found include Ficus species, Dalbergia sissoo (Indian Rosewood), Acacia nilotica, palms (date palm), semal (silk cotton tree), mangoes, guava, litchi, citrus etc. Certain flowering plants, smaller shrubs, and species used in local horticulture and agriculture are present: banana, plantains. Bhagalpur is famous for the Jardalu (Zardalu) Mango, a GI tagged Variety of Mango known for its unique light yellow skin, special aroma, golden pulp and sweet taste.

=== Fauna ===
Birdlife is rich. Bhagalpur has several wetlands (Jagatpur Lake, Sonbarsa Ghatora Lake, Ganga Prasad Lake) which attract both resident and migratory birds. During winters, many birds come from Trans-Himalayan, Central Asia, Siberia. The Greater Adjutant (locally called “Garuda”) (Leptoptilos dubius) is found breeding here. There is a rescue & rehab centre for it. Its numbers have gone up over time, from ~78 in mid-2000s to over 500 in later years in this district. Its most active hotspot is Kadwa Diara in Naugachia. In 1990 Bhagalpur district became home to the Vikramshila Gangetic Dolphin Sanctuary, which is 50 km (31.1 mi) in length. It protects the endangered Ganges river dolphin, among other aquatic species (freshwater turtles, etc.)
