= List of institutions of higher education in Bihar =

List of higher education institutions in Bihar, India

Bihar is home to 9 Institutes of National Importance, 4 Central Universities, 21 State Universities, 8 Private Universities & 1 Deemed University. The following is a list of institutions of higher education in Bihar, India.

Summary
TYPE	Number
INI	9
Central	4
State	21
Private	8
Deemed	1
Total	43-2= 41 Because 2 Central Universities are also INI

== Institutes of National Importance ==
S.No	University	Location	Type	Established	Specialization	Source
1	All India Institute of Medical Sciences, Patna	Patna	Autonomous	2012	Medical	
2	Dr. Rajendra Prasad Central Agriculture University	Samastipur	Autonomous	1905	Agriculture	
3	Indian Institute of Information Technology, Bhagalpur	Bhagalpur	Autonomous	2017	Science and Technology	
4	Indian Institute of Management Bodh Gaya	Bodh Gaya	Autonomous	2015	Management	
5	Indian Institute of Technology Patna	Patna	Autonomous	2008	Science and Technology	
6	Nalanda University	Rajgir	Autonomous	2010	Research	
7	National Institute of Pharmaceutical Education and Research, Hajipur	Hajipur	Autonomous	2007	Pharmacy	
8	National Institute of Technology, Patna	Patna	Autonomous	1886 (1924) (2004)	Science and Technology	
9	Officers Training Academy	Gaya	Indian Army	2011	Pre Commissioning Training	

== Central Universities ==
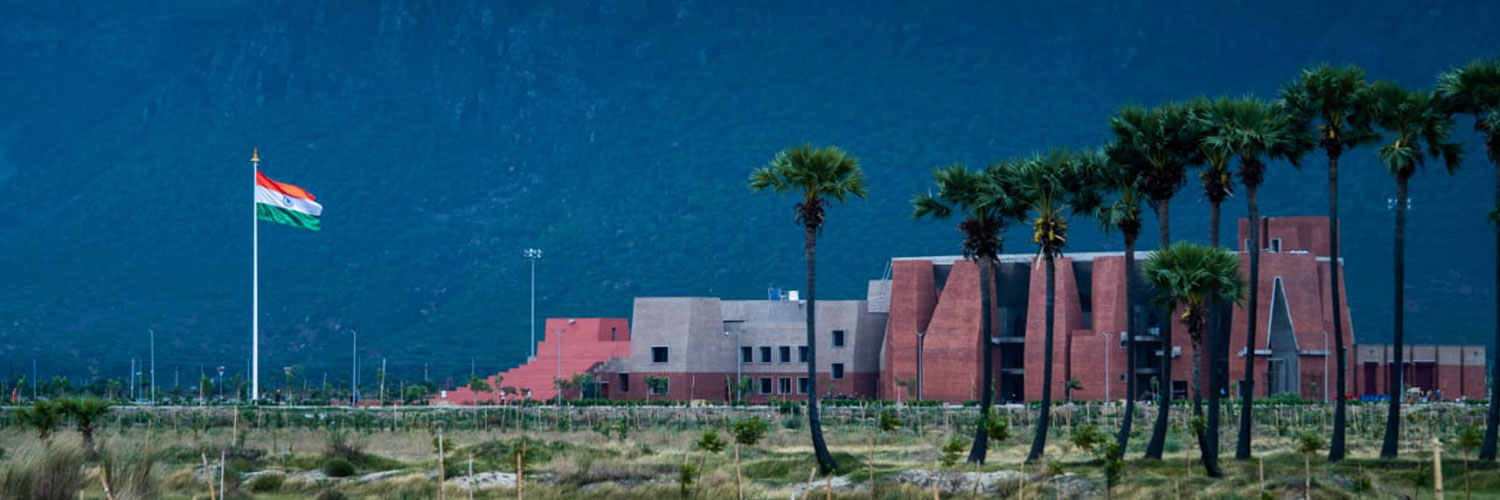
Nalanda University, Rajgir

S.No	University	Location	Established	Specialization	Sources
1	Central University of South Bihar	Gaya	2009	General	
2	Dr. Rajendra Prasad Central Agricultural University	Samastipur	1905 (1970) (2016)	Agriculture	
3	Mahatma Gandhi Central University	Motihari	2016	General	
4	Nalanda University	Rajgir	2010	Research	

== State Universities ==
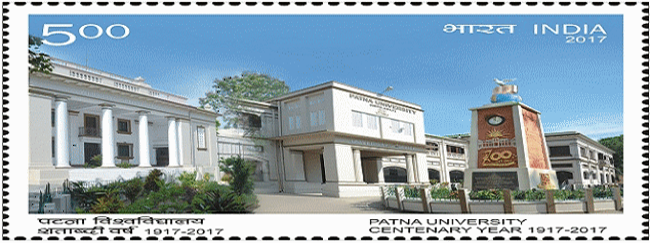
Patna University depicted on a 2017 stamp.

University	Location	Established	Specialization	Permanent campus	Sources
Aryabhatta Knowledge University	Patna	2010	Professional	Available	
Bhupendra Narayan Mandal University	Madhepura	1992	General	Available	
Bihar Agricultural University	Bhagalpur	2009	Agriculture	Available	
Bihar Animal Sciences University	Patna	2016	Veterinary	Available	
Bihar Engineering University	Patna	2021	Engineering	Temporary	
Bihar Sports University	Nalanda	2024	Sports	Temporary	
Bihar University of Health Sciences	Patna	2022	Medical	Temporary	
B. R. Ambedkar Bihar University	Muzaffarpur	1952	General	Available	
Chanakya National Law University	Patna	2006	Legal	Available	
Jai Prakash University	Chhapra	1990	General	Available	
Kameshwar Singh Darbhanga Sanskrit University	Darbhanga	1961	Sanskrit	Available	
Lalit Narayan Mithila University	Darbhanga	1972	General	Available	
Magadh University	Bodhgaya	1962	General	Available	
Maulana Mazharul Haque Arabic and Persian University	Patna	2004	Arabic, Persian	Available	
Munger University	Munger	2018	General	Temporary	
Nalanda Open University	Patna	1987	Distance education	Available	
Patna University	Patna	1917	General	Available	
Patliputra University	Patna	2018	General	Temporary	
Purnea University	Purnea	2018	General	Temporary	
Tilka Manjhi Bhagalpur University	Bhagalpur	1960	General	Available	
Veer Kunwar Singh University	Arrah	1992	General	Available	

== Private Universities ==
S.No	University	Location	Established	Specialization	Permanent campus	Sources
1	Al-Karim University	Katihar	2018	Medical	Available	
2	Amity University, Patna	Patna	2017	General	Available	
3	Dr. C.V. Raman University, Bihar	Vaishali	2018	General	Available	
4	Gopal Narayan Singh University	Rohtas	2018	General	Available	
5	K. K. University	Biharsharif	2017	General	Available	
6	Mata Gujri University	Kishanganj	2018	Medical	Available	
7	Sandip University, Sijoul	Madhubani	2017	General	Available	
8	Xavier University, Patna	Patna	2025	General	Available	

== Deemed University ==
University	Location	Type	Established	Specialization	Permanent campus	Sources
Nava Nalanda Mahavihara	Nalanda	Deemed	1951 (2006)	Buddhism and Pali	Available	

== Centrally Funded Eminent Institutes ==
- Central Institute of Plastics Engineering & Technology, Hajipur (CIPET Hajipur)
- Indian Railways Institute of Mechanical and Electrical Engineering, Jamalpur (IRIMEE Jamalpur)
- Institute of Hotel Management, Catering Technology & Applied Nutrition, Hajipur
- National Institute of Fashion Technology Patna (NIFT Patna)
- National Institute of Electronics and Information Technology (NIELIT, Patna)

== Medical Colleges ==
As of June 2018, Bihar had 14 functional medical colleges, of which 9 were owned by the state government, 3 were private medical colleges affiliated with BUHS and two autonomous organisations – IGIMS and AIIMS Patna.

Name	Established	City	University	Type	Permanent Campus	Comments	Ref.
All India Institute of Medical Sciences, Patna	2012	Patna	Autonomous	Public	Available		
Anugrah Narayan Magadh Medical College and Hospital	1969	Gaya	Bihar University of Health Sciences	Government	Available		
Darbhanga Medical College and Hospital	1946	Darbhanga	Bihar University of Health Sciences	Government	Available		
Government Medical College, Bettiah	2008	Bettiah	Bihar University of Health Sciences	Government	Available		
Government Medical College and Hospital, Purnea	2023	Purnea	Bihar University of Health Sciences	Government	Available		
Indira Gandhi Institute of Medical Sciences	1983	Patna	Autonomous	Public	Available		
Jannayak Karpoori Thakur Medical College and Hospital, Madhepura	2020	Madhepura	Bihar University of Health Sciences	Government	Available		
Jawaharlal Nehru Medical College and Hospital	1970	Bhagalpur	Bihar University of Health Sciences	Government	Available		
Katihar Medical College and Hospital	1987	Katihar	Al-Karim University	Private	Available		
Lord Buddha Koshi Medical College and Hospital	2012	Saharsa	Bihar University of Health Sciences	Private	Available		
Madhubani Medical College and Hospital	2019	Madhubani	Bihar University of Health Sciences	Private	Available		
Mata Gujri Memorial Medical College	1990	Kishanganj	Mata Gujri Memorial Medical College	Private	Available		
Nalanda Medical College Hospital	1970	Patna	Bihar University of Health Sciences	Government	Available		
Narayan Medical College and Hospital	2008	Sasaram	Veer Kunwar Singh University	Private	Available		
Netaji Subhas Medical College and Hospital	2020	Bihta	Bihar University of Health Sciences	Private	Available		
Patna Medical College and Hospital	1925	Patna	Bihar University of Health Sciences	Government	Available		
Radha Devi Jageshwari Memorial Medical College and Hospital	2021	Muzaffarpur	Bihar University of Health Sciences	Private	Available		
Rajendra Memorial Research Institute of Medical Sciences	1963	Patna	University of Calcutta	Government	Available	Research Institute	
Shree Narayan Medical Institute and Hospital	2021	Saharsa	Bihar University of Health Sciences	Private	Available		
Sri Krishna Medical College and Hospital	1970	Muzaffarpur	Bihar University of Health Sciences	Government	Available		
Vardhman Institute of Medical Sciences	2013	Pawapuri	Bihar University of Health Sciences	Government	Available		

== Ayurvedic, Unani and Homeopathy Medical Colleges Affiliated to BUHS ==
Name	Established	City	University	Type	Permanent Campus	Comments	Ref.
Dayanand Ayurvedic Medical College And Hospital	1972	Siwan	Kameshwar Singh Darbhanga Sanskrit University	Private	Available	BAMS	
Dr. Yadubir Sinha Homoeopathic Medical College & Hospital	1968	Darbhanga	Babasaheb Bhimrao Ambedkar Bihar University	Private	Available	BHMS	
Government Ayodhya Shivkumari Ayurved College & Hospital	1946	Begusarai	Bihar University of Health Sciences	Government	Available	BAMS	
Government Tibbi College and Hospital, Patna	1926	Patna	Aryabhatta Knowledge University	Government	Available	BUMS	
G.D. Memorial Homoeopathic Medical College & Hospital	2001	Patna	Babasaheb Bhimrao Ambedkar Bihar University	Private	Available	BHMS	
Magadh Homoeopathic Medical College and Hospital Nalanda	1969	Bihar Sharif	Babasaheb Bhimrao Ambedkar Bihar University	Private	Available	BHMS	
Maharshi Menhi Homoeopathic Medical College and Hospital	1980	Katihar	Babasaheb Bhimrao Ambedkar Bihar University	Private	Available	BHMS	
Muzaffarpur Homoeopathic Medical College & Hospital	1979	Muzaffarpur	Babasaheb Bhimrao Ambedkar Bihar University	Private	Available	BHMS	
Nezamia Unani Medical College & Hospital	1985	Gaya	Babasaheb Bhimrao Ambedkar Bihar University	Private	Available	BUMS	
Patna Homoeopathic Medical College and Hospital	1961	Patna	Babasaheb Bhimrao Ambedkar Bihar University	Private	Available	BHMS	
Rajkiya Ayurvedic College & Hospital	1926	Patna	Bihar University of Health Sciences	Government	Available	BAMS	
R.B.T.S. Govt. Homoeopathic Medical College And Hospital	1958	Muzaffarpur	Babasaheb Bhimrao Ambedkar Bihar University	Government	Available	BHMS	
R. D. Kedia Homoeopathic Medical College & Hospital	1979	Motihari	Babasaheb Bhimrao Ambedkar Bihar University	Private	Available	BHMS	
Salfia Unani Medical College & Hospital	1981	Darbhanga	Babasaheb Bhimrao Ambedkar Bihar University	Private	Available	BUMS	
Shri Moti Singh Jageshwari Ayurved College & Hospital	1973	Chhapra	Babasaheb Bhimrao Ambedkar Bihar University	Private	Available	BAMS	
Sufia Unani Medical College Hospital & Research Centre	2010	East Champaran	Babasaheb Bhimrao Ambedkar Bihar University	Private	Available	BUMS	
Swami Raghvendracharya Tridandi Ayurved Mahavidyalaya and Hospital	1972	Gaya	Babasaheb Bhimrao Ambedkar Bihar University	Private	Available	BAMS	
Z.H.Unani Medical College & Hospital	1979	Siwan	Babasaheb Bhimrao Ambedkar Bihar University	Private	Available	BUMS	

== Dental Colleges Affiliated to BUHS ==
Name	Established	City	University	Type	Permanent Campus	Ref.
Buddha Institute of Dental Sciences and Hospital	1984	Patna	Magadh University	Private	Available	
Dr. B.R. Ambedkar Institute of Dental Sciences & Hospital	1990	Patna	Magadh University	Private	Available	
Dr. S.M. Naqui Imam Dental College & Hospital	1989	Darbhanga	Lalit Narayan Mithila University	Private	Available	
Mithila Minority Dental College and Hospital	1989	Darbhanga	Lalit Narayan Mithila University	Private	Available	
Patna Dental College	1960	Patna	Bihar University of Health Sciences	Government	Available	
Sarjug Dental College, Darbhanga	1988	Darbhanga	Lalit Narayan Mithila University	Private	Available	

== Pharmacy Colleges Affiliated to BUHS ==
Name	Established	City	University	Type	Permanent Campus	Ref.
Bihar College of Pharmacy	1979	Patna	Bihar University of Health Sciences	Private	Available	
Chanakya College of Pharmacy and Medical Sciences, Bhojpur	2008	Bhojpur	Bihar University of Health Sciences	Private	Available	
Gautam Institute of Pharmacy	2008	Nalanda	Bihar University of Health Sciences	Private	Available	
Government Pharmacy Institute, Patna	1958	Patna	Bihar University of Health Sciences	Government	Available	
SNS College of Pharmacy	2019	Motihari	Bihar University of Health Sciences	Private	Available	

== Nursing Colleges ==
Name	Established	City	University	Type	Permanent Campus	Ref.
AHS Nursing College & Hospital	2023	Samastipur	Bihar University of Health Sciences	Private	Available	
Alay Fatima Hai College of Nursing	2023	Patna	Bihar University of Health Sciences	Private	Available	
Narayana Nursing College	2012	Rohtas	Gopal Narayan Singh University	Private	Available	

== MBA Colleges ==
Name	Established	City	University	Type	Permanent Campus	Ref.
A N College	1956	Patna	Patliputra University	Government	Available	
Catalyst Institute of Management and Advance Global Excellence	2009	Patna	Patliputra University	Private	Available	
Chandragupt Institute of Management	2011	Patna	AICTE	Government	Available	
College of Commerce, Arts and Science, Patna	1949	Patna	Patliputra University	Government	Available	
Development Management Institute	2014	Patna	AICTE	Government	Available	
Gaya College	1944	Gaya	Magadh University	Government	Available	
International School of Management, Patna	2011	Patna	AICTE	Private	Available	
J.D. Women's College	1971	Patna	Patliputra University	Government	Available	
Lalit Narayan Mishra Institute of Economic Development and Social Change, Patna	1973	Patna	Aryabhatta Knowledge University	Government	Available	
L.N. Mishra College of Business Management	1973	Muzaffarpur	Babasaheb Bhimrao Ambedkar Bihar University	Government	Available	
Magadh Professional Institute	2022	Patna	Aryabhatta Knowledge University	Private	Available	
Nalanda College, Biharsharif	1870	Biharsharif	Patliputra University	Government	Available	
Vaishali Institute of Business and Rural Management	1983	Muzaffarpur	Babasaheb Bhimrao Ambedkar Bihar University	Private	Available	

== B. Ed. Government College ==
Name	Seat	City	University	Ref.
College of Teacher Education, Gaya	100	Gaya	Magadh University	
College of Teacher education (CET), Saharsa	100	Saharsa	Bhupendra Narayan Mandal University	
College Of Teacher Education, Turki	100	Muzaffarpur	Babasaheb Bhimrao Ambedkar Bihar University	
Govt. Teachers’ Training College, Near Ghantaghar Bhagalpur	100	Bhagalpur	Tilka Manjhi Bhagalpur University	
Govt. College of Teacher Education, Samastipur	100	Samastipur	Lalit Narayan Mithila University	
Patna Training College	100	Patna	Patna University	
Women's Training College	100	Patna	Patna University	

== Other Degree Colleges ==
Name	Established	City	University	Type	Permanent Campus	Ref.
ANS College, Barh	1951	Patna	Patliputra University	Government	Available	
B.D. College, Patna	1970	Patna	Patliputra University	Government	Available	
BS College, Danapur	1954	Patna	Patliputra University	Government	Available	
Bihar National College	1889	Patna	Patna University	Government	Available	
Deo Chand College, Hajipur	1968	Hajipur	Babasaheb Bhimrao Ambedkar Bihar University	Government	Available	
Ganga Devi Mahila College	1971	Patna	Patliputra University	Government	Available	
Gautam Buddha Mahila College	1953	Gaya	Magadh University	Government	Available	
G.J. College, Bihta	1958	Bihta	Patliputra University	Government	Available	
Jagat Narain Lal College	1960	Patna	Patliputra University	Government	Available	
Jamuni Lal College	1969	Hajipur	Babasaheb Bhimrao Ambedkar Bihar University	Government	Available	
Kisan College, Nalanda	1957	Bihar Sharif	Patliputra University	Government	Available	
Langat Singh College	1899	Muzaffarpur	Babasaheb Bhimrao Ambedkar Bihar University	Government	Available	
Mahant Darshan Das Mahila College	1946	Muzaffarpur	Babasaheb Bhimrao Ambedkar Bihar University	Government	Available	
Mahila College, Khagaul	1972	Patna	Patliputra University	Government	Available	
Maltidhari College, Naubatpur	1956	Patna	Patliputra University	Government	Available	
Marwari College, Bhagalpur	1941	Bhagalpur	Tilka Majhi Bhagalpur University	Government	Available	
Mirza Ghalib College	1969	Gaya	Magadh University	Government	Available	
MM College, Bikram	1961	Patna	Patliputra University	Government	Available	
Murarka College	1955	Sultanganj	Tilka Manjhi Bhagalpur University	Government	Available	
Nalanda Mahila College	1975	Biharsharif	Patliputra University	Government	Available	
Patna College	1863	Patna	Patna University	Government	Available	
Patna Science College	1927	Patna	Patna University	Government	Available	
Ram Krishna Dwarika College, Patna	1964	Patna	Patliputra University	Government	Available	
Ram Ratan Singh College	1957	Patna	Patliputra University	Government	Available	
R.D. & D.J. College, Munger	1898	Munger	Munger University	Government	Available	
Paras Nath Kushwaha College	1978	Achhua	Patliputra University	Government	Available	
Raj Narain College, Hajipur	1952	Hajipur	Babasaheb Bhimrao Ambedkar Bihar University	Government	Available	
Rajendra College, Chapra	1938	Chhapra	Jai Prakash University	Government	Available	
RLSY College Aurangabad	1971	Aurangabad	Magadh University	Government	Available	
RLSY College, Bakhtiyarpur	1964	Patna	Patliputra University	Government	Available	
RPM College, Patna	1970	Patna	Patliputra University	Government	Available	
Sachchidananda Sinha College	1943	Aurangabad	Magadh University	Government	Available	
Sardar Patel Memorial College	1974	Biharsharif	Patliputra University	Government	Available	
SMD College, Punpun	1958	Patna	Patliputra University	Government	Available	
S.N. Sinha College, Jehanabad	1970	Jehanabad	Magadh University	Government	Available	
S.S. College, Jehanabad	1955	Jehanabad	Magadh University	Government	Available	
Sri Guru Gobind Singh College, Patna	1960	Patna	Patliputra University	Government	Available	
SU College, Hilsa	1957	Hilsa	Patliputra University	Government	Available	
Sunderwati Mahila College	1949	Bhagalpur	Tilka Majhi Bhagalpur University	Government	Available	
T.N.B. College, Bhagalpur	1883	Bhagalpur	Tilka Majhi Bhagalpur University	Government	Available	
TPS College, Patna	1960	Patna	Patliputra University	Government	Available	
Vaishali Mahila College	1971	Hajipur	Babasaheb Bhimrao Ambedkar Bihar University	Government	Available	

== Colleges under Bihar Agricultural University ==
The university has ten colleges:

Name	District	Established
Agriculture Business Management college	Patna District	2021
Bihar agriculture college, sabour	Bhagalpur district	1908
Bhola Paswan Shastri Agricultural College	Purnia District	2011
College of Agricultural Biotechnology, Sabour	Bhagalpur District	2021
College of Agricultural Engineering, Ara	Bhojpur District	2021
Dr Kalam Agricultural College	Kishanganj District	2015
Mandan Bharti Agriculture College, Agwanpur	Saharsa district	2011
Munger Forestry college	Munger District	2022
Nalanda College of Horticulture, Noorsarai	Nalanda District	2006
VKS College of Agriculture, Dumraon	Buxar District	2011

== Fashion, Art and Design ==
- A N College, Patna
- College of Arts and Crafts, Patna
- Footwear Design and Development Institute, Patna (FDDI Patna)
- National Institute of Fashion Technology, Patna (NIFT Patna)

== Hotel Management ==
- Institute of Hotel Management, Catering Technology & Applied Nutrition, Hajipur
- Institute of Hotel Management, BodhGaya

== Law Colleges ==
- Chanakya National Law University
- Central University of South Bihar (School of Law and Governance), GAYA JI
- R.M.M. Law College, Saharsa
- Anugrah Memorial Law college, Gaya
- B.M.T. Law College, Purnea
- Bidheh Law College, Madhubani
- Bihar Institute of Law, Patna
- Chanakya National Law University, Patna
- Mahadeo Singh Law College, Bhagalpur
- S.K.J. Law College, Muzaffarpur
- Samastipur Law College, Samastipur
- Vishwanath Singh Law College, Munger
- Narayan School of Law, Jamuhar, Sasaram
- RKA Law College, Begusarai

== Research Institutes ==
- Jagjivan Ram Institute of Parliamentary Studies & Political Research, Patna (JRIPSPR Patna)
- A N Sinha Institute of Social Studies, Patna (ICSSR - ANSISS Patna)
- Rajendra Memorial Research Institute of Medical Sciences, Patna (ICMR - RMRIMS)
- Centre for Development of Advanced Computing, Patna (C-DAC Patna)
- Centre for Development Practice and Research, Patna (TISS - CDPR Patna)
- The Kashi Prasad Jayaswal research Institute, Patna (KPJRI - Patna)
- Kedar Das Institute for Labour and Social Studies, Patna (KDILSS - Patna)

== Government Engineering Colleges under Bihar Engineering University ==
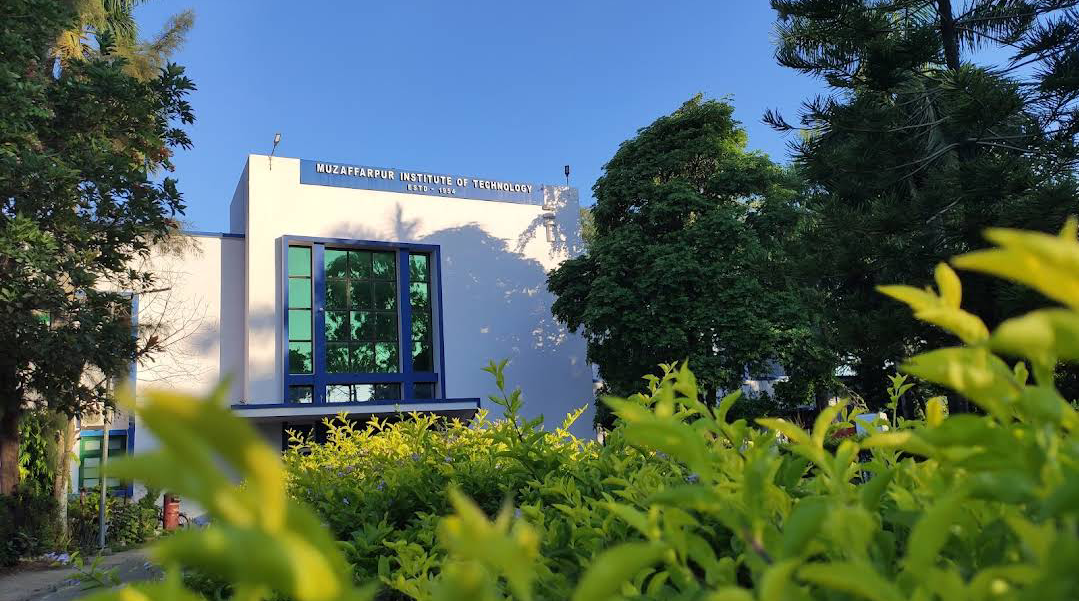
MIT, Muzaffarpur

There are a total of 38 government engineering colleges, located in each of the 38 districts of Bihar.

Name	District	Established
Muzaffarpur Institute of Technology	Muzaffarpur	1954
Gaya College of Engineering	Gaya	1958 (2008)
Bhagalpur College of Engineering	Bhagalpur	1960
Motihari College of Engineering	East Champaran	1980 (2008)
Darbhanga College of Engineering	Darbhanga	1982 (2008)
Nalanda College of Engineering	Nalanda	2008
Loknayak Jai Prakash Institute of Technology	Saran	2012
Sitamarhi Institute of Technology	Sitamarhi	2016
Bakhtiyarpur College of Engineering	Patna	2016
Rashtrakavi Ramdhari Singh Dinkar College of Engineering	Begusarai	2016
Katihar Engineering College	Katihar	2016
Shershah College of Engineering	Rohtas	2016
BP Mandal College of Engineering	Madhepura	2016
Saharsa College of Engineering	Saharsa	2017
Supaul College of Engineering	Supaul district	2017
Purnea College of Engineering	Purnia	2017
Government Engineering College, Vaishali	Vaishali	2018
Government Engineering College, Banka	Banka	2018
Government Engineering College, Jamui	Jamui	2018
Government Engineering College, Bhojpur	Bhojpur	2018
Government Engineering College, Siwan	Siwan	2018
Government Engineering College, Madhubani	Madhubani	2019
Government Engineering College, Arwal	Arwal	2019
Government Engineering College, Aurangabad	Aurangabad	2019
Government Engineering College, Jehanabad	Jehanabad	2019
Government Engineering College, Khagaria	Khagaria	2019
Government Engineering College, Buxar	Buxar	2019
Government Engineering College, Sheikhpura	Sheikhpura	2019
Government Engineering College, Lakhisarai	Lakhisarai	2019
Government Engineering College, Kishanganj	Kishanganj	2019
Government Engineering College, Sheohar	Sheohar	2019
Government Engineering College, Kaimur	Kaimur	2019
Government Engineering College, Gopalganj	Gopalganj	2019
Government Engineering College, Munger	Munger	2019
Government Engineering College, West Champaran	West Champaran	2019
Government Engineering College, Nawada	Nawada	2019
Government Engineering College, Samastipur	Samastipur	2019
Shri Phanishwar Nath Renu Engineering College	Araria	2019

== State Government-Aided Engineering Colleges ==
- BIT Mesra Extension Centre, Patna
- Dr. APJ Abdul Kalam Women's Institute of Technology, Darbhanga

== Private Engineering Colleges ==
- Buddha Institute of Technology, Gaya
- Maulana Azad College of Engineering and Technology, Patna
- Millia Institute of Technology, Purnea
- Moti Babu Institute of Technology, Forbesganj
- Netaji Subhas Institute of Technology, Bihta
- Patna Sahib College of Engineering & Technology, Vaishali
- R.P. Sharma Institute of Technology, Patna
- Vidya Vihar Institute of Technology, Purnea
- Vidyadaan Institute of Technology and Management, Buxar
- Sityog Institute of Technology, Aurangabad

== New Government Degree Colleges ==
On 15 July 2026, As part of saat nischay-3 initiative of the Bihar Government, over 211 new Government Degree Colleges are established, one for each Underserved Blocks. (Note: This list may not be complete)

S. No.	District	Block	University	Campus	Location
1	Madhepura	Ghailar	Bhupendra Narayan Mandal University	Temporary	
2	Madhepura	Kumarkhand	Bhupendra Narayan Mandal University	Temporary	
3	Madhepura	Shankarpur	Bhupendra Narayan Mandal University	Temporary	
4	Madhepura	Chausa	Bhupendra Narayan Mandal University	Temporary	
5	Saharsa	Sattar Kataiya	Bhupendra Narayan Mandal University	Temporary	
6	Saharsa	Nauhatta	Bhupendra Narayan Mandal University	Temporary	
7	Saharsa	Sour Bazar	Bhupendra Narayan Mandal University	Temporary	
8	Saharsa	Patarghat	Bhupendra Narayan Mandal University	Temporary	
9	Saharsa	Salkhua	Bhupendra Narayan Mandal University	Temporary	
10	Saharsa	Banma Itahri	Bhupendra Narayan Mandal University	Temporary	
11	Supaul	Kishanpur	Bhupendra Narayan Mandal University	Temporary	
12	Supaul	Saraigarh-Bhaptiyahi	Bhupendra Narayan Mandal University	Temporary	
13	Supaul	Pipra	Bhupendra Narayan Mandal University	Temporary	
14	Supaul	chhatapur	Bhupendra Narayan Mandal University	Temporary	
15	Supaul	Marauna	Bhupendra Narayan Mandal University	Temporary	
16	Supaul	pratapganj	Bhupendra Narayan Mandal University	Temporary	
17	East Champaran	Sangrampur	Babasaheb Bhimrao Ambedkar Bihar University	Temporary	
18	East Champaran	Mehsi	Babasaheb Bhimrao Ambedkar Bihar University	Temporary	
19	East Champaran	Banjaria	Babasaheb Bhimrao Ambedkar Bihar University	Temporary	
20	East Champaran	Piprakothi	Babasaheb Bhimrao Ambedkar Bihar University	Temporary	
21	East Champaran	Sugauli	Babasaheb Bhimrao Ambedkar Bihar University	Temporary	
22	East Champaran	Turkaulia	Babasaheb Bhimrao Ambedkar Bihar University	Temporary	
23	East Champaran	Tetaria	Babasaheb Bhimrao Ambedkar Bihar University	Temporary	
24	East Champaran	Patahi	Babasaheb Bhimrao Ambedkar Bihar University	Temporary	
25	East Champaran	Phenhara	Babasaheb Bhimrao Ambedkar Bihar University	Temporary	
26	East Champaran	Ramgarhwa	Babasaheb Bhimrao Ambedkar Bihar University	Temporary	
27	East Champaran	Adapur	Babasaheb Bhimrao Ambedkar Bihar University	Temporary	
28	East Champaran	Chauradano	Babasaheb Bhimrao Ambedkar Bihar University	Temporary	
29	East Champaran	Bankatwa	Babasaheb Bhimrao Ambedkar Bihar University	Temporary	
30	East Champaran	Chiraiya	Babasaheb Bhimrao Ambedkar Bihar University	Temporary	
31	West Champaran	Piprasi	Babasaheb Bhimrao Ambedkar Bihar University	Temporary	
32	West Champaran	Bhitaha	Babasaheb Bhimrao Ambedkar Bihar University	Temporary	
33	West Champaran	Bairiya	Babasaheb Bhimrao Ambedkar Bihar University	Temporary	
34	West Champaran	Sikta	Babasaheb Bhimrao Ambedkar Bihar University	Temporary	
35	West Champaran	Yogapatti	Babasaheb Bhimrao Ambedkar Bihar University	Temporary	
36	West Champaran	Thakaraha	Babasaheb Bhimrao Ambedkar Bihar University	Temporary	
37	Vaishali	Bidupur	Babasaheb Bhimrao Ambedkar Bihar University	Temporary	
39	Vaishali	Patedhi Belsar	Babasaheb Bhimrao Ambedkar Bihar University	Temporary	
39	Muzaffarpur	Aurai	Babasaheb Bhimrao Ambedkar Bihar University	Temporary	
40	Muzaffarpur	Bochahan	Babasaheb Bhimrao Ambedkar Bihar University	Temporary	
41	Muzaffarpur	Gaighat	Babasaheb Bhimrao Ambedkar Bihar University	Temporary	
42	Muzaffarpur	Muraul	Babasaheb Bhimrao Ambedkar Bihar University	Temporary	
43	Sheohar	Dumri Katsari	Babasaheb Bhimrao Ambedkar Bihar University	Temporary	
44	Sheohar	Piprahi	Babasaheb Bhimrao Ambedkar Bihar University	Temporary	
45	Sheohar	Purnahiya	Babasaheb Bhimrao Ambedkar Bihar University	Temporary	
46	Sitamarhi	Bajpatti	Babasaheb Bhimrao Ambedkar Bihar University	Temporary	
47	Sitamarhi	Bokhra	Babasaheb Bhimrao Ambedkar Bihar University	Temporary	
48	Sitamarhi	Choraut	Babasaheb Bhimrao Ambedkar Bihar University	Temporary	
49	Sitamarhi	Majorganj	Babasaheb Bhimrao Ambedkar Bihar University	Temporary	
50	Sitamarhi	Nanpur	Babasaheb Bhimrao Ambedkar Bihar University	Temporary	
51	Sitamarhi	Parsauni	Babasaheb Bhimrao Ambedkar Bihar University	Temporary	
52	Sitamarhi	Runni Saidpur	Babasaheb Bhimrao Ambedkar Bihar University	Temporary	
53	Sitamarhi	Sonbarsa	Babasaheb Bhimrao Ambedkar Bihar University	Temporary	
54	Sitamarhi	Suppi	Babasaheb Bhimrao Ambedkar Bihar University	Temporary	
55	Saran	Ekma	Jay Prakash University	Temporary	
56	Saran	Lahladpur	Jay Prakash University	Temporary	
57	Saran	Maker	Jay Prakash University	Temporary	
58	Saran	Isuapur	Jay Prakash University	Temporary	
59	Saran	Marhaura	Jay Prakash University	Temporary	
60	Saran	Mashrak	Jay Prakash University	Temporary	
61	Saran	Panapur	Jay Prakash University	Temporary	
62	Saran	Taraiya	Jay Prakash University	Temporary	
63	Saran	Dariyapur	Jay Prakash University	Temporary	
64	Siwan	Basantpur	Jay Prakash University	Temporary	
65	Siwan	Bhagwanpur Hat	Jay Prakash University	Temporary	
66	Siwan	Lakri Nabiganj	Jay Prakash University	Temporary	
67	Siwan	Andar	Jay Prakash University	Temporary	
68	Siwan	Darauli	Jay Prakash University	Temporary	
69	Siwan	Guntur	Jay Prakash University	Temporary	
70	Siwan	Hasan Pura	Jay Prakash University	Temporary	
71	Siwan	Hussainganj	Jay Prakash University	Temporary	
72	Siwan	Nautan	Jay Prakash University	Temporary	
73	Siwan	Siswan	Jay Prakash University	Temporary	
74	Gopalganj	Baikunthpur	Jay Prakash University	Temporary	
75	Gopalganj	Barauli	Jay Prakash University	Temporary	
76	Gopalganj	Manjha	Jay Prakash University	Temporary	
77	Gopalganj	Sidhwaliya	Jay Prakash University	Temporary	
78	Gopalganj	Kateya	Jay Prakash University	Temporary	
79	Gopalganj	Panchdewari	Jay Prakash University	Temporary	
80	Gopalganj	Phulwariya	Jay Prakash University	Temporary	
81	Gopalganj	Uchkagaon	Jay Prakash University	Temporary	
82	Gopalganj	Vijayipur	Jay Prakash University	Temporary	
83	Begusarai	Matihani	Lalit Narayan Mithila University	Temporary	
84	Begusarai	Birpur	Lalit Narayan Mithila University	Temporary	
85	Begusarai	Dandari	Lalit Narayan Mithila University	Temporary	
86	Begusarai	Sahebpur Kamal	Lalit Narayan Mithila University	Temporary	
87	Begusarai	Bachhwara	Lalit Narayan Mithila University	Temporary	
88	Begusarai	Bhagwanpur	Lalit Narayan Mithila University	Temporary	
89	Begusarai	Mansoorchak	Lalit Narayan Mithila University	Temporary	
90	Begusarai	Chhorahi	Lalit Narayan Mithila University	Temporary	
91	Begusarai	Khudabandpur	Lalit Narayan Mithila University	Temporary	
92	Begusarai	Garhpura	Lalit Narayan Mithila University	Temporary	
93	Begusarai	Nawkothi	Lalit Narayan Mithila University	Temporary	
94	Darbhanga	Kusheshwar Asthan	Lalit Narayan Mithila University	Temporary	
95	Darbhanga	Kusheshwar Asthan East	Lalit Narayan Mithila University	Temporary	
96	Darbhanga	Kiratpur	Lalit Narayan Mithila University	Temporary	
97	Darbhanga	Gaura Bauram	Lalit Narayan Mithila University	Temporary	
98	Darbhanga	Singhwara	Lalit Narayan Mithila University	Temporary	
99	Darbhanga	Tardih	Lalit Narayan Mithila University	Temporary	
100	Darbhanga	Hanuman Nagar	Lalit Narayan Mithila University	Temporary	
101	Madhubani	Khjauli	Lalit Narayan Mithila University	Temporary	
102	Madhubani	Basopatti	Lalit Narayan Mithila University	Temporary	
103	Madhubani	Bisfi	Lalit Narayan Mithila University	Temporary	
104	Madhubani	Harlakhi	Lalit Narayan Mithila University	Temporary	
105	Madhubani	Phulparas	Lalit Narayan Mithila University	Temporary	
106	Madhubani	Khutauna	Lalit Narayan Mithila University	Temporary	
107	Madhubani	Laukahi	Lalit Narayan Mithila University	Temporary	
108	Samastipur	Khanpur	Lalit Narayan Mithila University	Temporary	
109	Samastipur	Kalyanpur	Lalit Narayan Mithila University	Temporary	
110	Samastipur	Bithan	Lalit Narayan Mithila University	Temporary	
111	Samastipur	Singhiya	Lalit Narayan Mithila University	Temporary	
112	Samastipur	Vidyapatinagar	Lalit Narayan Mithila University	Temporary	
113	Arwal	Sonbhadra Banshi Suryapur	Magadh University	Temporary	
114	Aurangabad	Madanpur	Magadh University	Temporary	
115	Aurangabad	Obra	Magadh University	Temporary	
116	Gaya	Tankuppa	Magadh University	Temporary	
117	Gaya	Konch	Magadh University	Temporary	
118	Gaya	Guraru	Magadh University	Temporary	
119	Gaya	Atri	Magadh University	Temporary	
120	Gaya	Bathani	Magadh University	Temporary	
121	Gaya	Mohra	Magadh University	Temporary	
122	Gaya	Gurua	Magadh University	Temporary	
123	Gaya	Banke Bazar	Magadh University	Temporary	
124	Gaya	Dumariya	Magadh University	Temporary	
125	Gaya	Mohanpur	Magadh University	Temporary	
126	Jehanabad	Makhdumpur	Magadh University	Temporary	
127	Jehanabad	Modanganj	Magadh University	Temporary	
128	Nawada	Kashichak	Magadh University	Temporary	
129	Nawada	Akbarpur	Magadh University	Temporary	
130	Nawada	Govindpur	Magadh University	Temporary	
131	Nawada	Meskaur	Magadh University	Temporary	
132	Nawada	Roh	Magadh University	Temporary	
133	Nawada	Siradala	Magadh University	Temporary	
134	Jamui	Khaira	Munger University	Temporary	
135	Jamui	Sono	Munger University	Temporary	
136	Jamui	Laxmipur	Munger University	Temporary	
137	Jamui	Islamnagar Aliganj	Munger University	Temporary	
138	Khagaria	Chautham	Munger University	Temporary	
139	Khagaria	Mansi	Munger University	Temporary	
140	Khagaria	Beldaur	Munger University	Temporary	
141	Lakhisarai	Pipariya	Munger University	Temporary	
142	Lakhisarai	Halsi	Munger University	Temporary	
143	Lakhisarai	Chanan	Munger University	Temporary	
144	Lakhisarai	Ramgarh Chowk	Munger University	Temporary	
145	Munger	Bariyarpur	Munger University	Temporary	
146	Munger	Dharhara	Munger University	Temporary	
147	Munger	Tetiyabambar	Munger University	Temporary	
148	Sheikhpura	Ariari	Munger University	Temporary	
149	Sheikhpura	Chewara	Munger University	Temporary	
150	Sheikhpura	Ghatkusumbha	Munger University	Temporary	
151	Sheikhpura	Shekhopursarai	Munger University	Temporary	
152	Nalanda	Rahui	Patliputra University	Temporary	
153	Nalanda	Noorsarai	Patliputra University	Temporary	
154	Nalanda	Bind	Patliputra University	Temporary	
155	Nalanda	Nagarnausa	Patliputra University	Temporary	
156	Nalanda	Katrisarai	Patliputra University	Temporary	
157	Nalanda	Tharthari	Patliputra University	Temporary	
158	Nalanda	Karai Parsurai	Patliputra University	Temporary	
159	Nalanda	Parwalpur	Patliputra University	Temporary	
160	Nalanda	Sarmera	Patliputra University	Temporary	
161	Patna	Sampatchak	Patliputra University	Temporary	
162	Patna	Daniyawan	Patliputra University	Temporary	
163	Patna	Khusrupur	Patliputra University	Temporary	
164	Patna	Athmalgola	Patliputra University	Temporary	
165	Patna	Belchhi	Patliputra University	Temporary	
166	Patna	Ghoswari	Patliputra University	Temporary	
167	Patna	Maner	Patliputra University	Temporary	
168	Araria	Jokihat	Purnea University	Temporary	
169	Araria	Sikti	Purnea University	Temporary	
170	Araria	Palasi	Purnea University	Temporary	
171	Araria	Narpatganj	Purnea University	Temporary	
172	Araria	Bhargama	Purnea University	Temporary	
173	Katihar	Dandkhora	Purnea University	Temporary	
174	Katihar	Hasanganj	Purnea University	Temporary	
175	Katihar	Korha	Purnea University	Temporary	
176	Katihar	Sameli	Purnea University	Temporary	
177	Katihar	Kursela	Purnea University	Temporary	
178	Katihar	Mansahi	Purnea University	Temporary	
179	Katihar	Amdabad	Purnea University	Temporary	
180	Kishanganj	Dighalbank	Purnea University	Temporary	
181	Kishanganj	Kochadhaman	Purnea University	Temporary	
182	Kishanganj	Terhagachh	Purnea University	Temporary	
183	Purnia	Jalalgarh	Purnea University	Temporary	
184	Purnia	Krityanand Nagar	Purnea University	Temporary	
185	Purnia	Rupauli	Purnea University	Temporary	
186	Purnia	Amour	Purnea University	Temporary	
187	Purnia	Baisa	Purnea University	Temporary	
188	Banka	Amarpur	Tilka Manjhi Bhagalpur University	Temporary	
189	Banka	Barahat	Tilka Manjhi Bhagalpur University	Temporary	
190	Banka	Belhar	Tilka Manjhi Bhagalpur University	Temporary	
192	Banka	Fullidumer	Tilka Manjhi Bhagalpur University	Temporary	
193	Bhagalpur	Goradih	Tilka Manjhi Bhagalpur University	Temporary	
194	Bhagalpur	Pirpainty	Tilka Manjhi Bhagalpur University	Temporary	
195	Bhagalpur	Sanhaula	Tilka Manjhi Bhagalpur University	Temporary	
196	Bhagalpur	Gopalpur	Tilka Manjhi Bhagalpur University	Temporary	
197	Bhagalpur	Ismailpur	Tilka Manjhi Bhagalpur University	Temporary	
198	Bhagalpur	Kharik	Tilka Manjhi Bhagalpur University	Temporary	
199	Bhagalpur	Rangrachowk	Tilka Manjhi Bhagalpur University	Temporary	
200	Bhojpur	Agiaon	Veer Kunwar Singh University	Temporary	
201	Bhojpur	Sandesh	Veer Kunwar Singh University	Temporary	
202	Bhojpur	Sahar	Veer Kunwar Singh University	Temporary	
203	Bhojpur	Charpokhari	Veer Kunwar Singh University	Temporary	
204	Buxar	Brahmpur	Veer Kunwar Singh University	Temporary	
205	Buxar	Kesath	Veer Kunwar Singh University	Temporary	
206	Buxar	Chakki	Veer Kunwar Singh University	Temporary	
207	Buxar	Chaugain	Veer Kunwar Singh University	Temporary	
208	Kaimur	Chainpur	Veer Kunwar Singh University	Temporary	
209	Kaimur	Rampur	Veer Kunwar Singh University	Temporary	
210	Kaimur	Nuaon	Veer Kunwar Singh University	Temporary	
211	Rohtas	Shivsagar	Veer Kunwar Singh University	Temporary	
212	Rohtas	Rohtas	Veer Kunwar Singh University	Temporary	
213	Rohtas	Karakat	Veer Kunwar Singh University	Temporary	
214	Rohtas	Sanjhauli	Veer Kunwar Singh University	Temporary	
215	Rohtas	Suryapura	Veer Kunwar Singh University	Temporary	

== See also ==
- Lists of institutions of higher education in India
- List of educational institutions in Patna
- List of educational institutes in Bhagalpur
