= Bakhtiyarpur College of Engineering =

Government engineering college in Bakhtiyarpur, Bihar

Bakhtiyarpur College of Engineering, Patna
- and
- Other name: BCE PATNA
- Type: Government Engineering college
- Established: 2016 (10 years ago)
- Affiliations: Bihar Engineering University
- Principal: DR. Amrita Sinha
- Faculty: 50
- Administrative staff: 30
- Students: 1200
- Undergraduates: 1200
- Location: Patna, Bihar, India
- Campus: Rural
- Acronym: BCE
- Website: bcebakhtiyarpur.ac.in

Bakhtiyarpur College of Engineering (BCE Patna) is a public institute in Bakhtiyarpur (Patna) run under the Department of Science and Technology, Bihar.

== History ==
BCE Patna was established in 2016 by the Government of Bihar via its Department of Science and Technology, Bihar. BCE Patna is recognized by the AICTE and is affiliated to Bihar Engineering University (BEU). Its first academic session was started in 2016 on the old university grounds of the Indian Institute of Technology Patna in the Pataliputra Housing Colony.

== Programs ==
The institute offers full-time Bachelor of Technology (B.Tech.) degree programs in specific science and technology disciplines, including seven engineering branches.

== Departments ==
Undergraduate programs
Departmental Courses in B.Tech. offered	Intake and seats available
B.Tech. Civil Engineering	90 (Normal Entry Seats) +4 (Tuition Fee Waiver seats) +9 (Lateral Entry)
B.Tech. Computer Science and Engineering	60 (Normal Entry Seats) +3 (Tuition Fee Waiver seats) +6 (Lateral Entry)
B.Tech. Electrical and Electronics Engineering	60 (Normal Entry Seats) +3 (Tuition Fee Waiver seats) +6 (Lateral Entry)
B.Tech. Mechanical Engineering	60 (Normal Entry Seats) +3 (Tuition Fee Waiver seats) +6 (Lateral Entry)
B.Tech. Computer Science and Engineering with specialisation in Internet of Things	60 (Normal Entry Seats) +3 (Tuition Fee Waiver seats) +6 (Lateral Entry)
B.Tech. Mathematics and Computing	60 (Normal Entry Seats) +3 (Tuition Fee Waiver seats) +6 (Lateral Entry)
B.Tech. Fire Technology and Safety	30 (Normal Entry Seats) +2 (Tuition Fee Waiver seats) +3 (Lateral Entry)

== Admission ==
The Bihar Combined Entrance Competitive Examination Board (BCECEB) conducts an exam based on the Merit List of the Bihar Combined Entrance Competitive Examination.

After 2019, admissions for the state engineering colleges of Bihar are based on JEE-MAIN marks.

== Campus ==
BCE Bakhtiyarpur's new own campus at Bakhtiyarpur was inaugurated on February 2, 2020. It is about 3.5 km from Bakhtiyarpur Junction railway station by road. This campus is near the Dedaur village area just beside the railway lines. The college has started its 2020 session from this campus along with the temporary campus for GEC Bhojpur and GEC Buxar.

The university grounds are composed by the Academic and Administrative building, the Library building along with a public canteen on ground floor, three boys and one girls hostels, the principal's residency, the residencies for the professors, security buildings and other offices. It also includes an open theatre, which serves as the cultural, social and activities center. Sports grounds are located at the center of the campus. The university is located about 1 km from the main local road. A new academic building, a girl's hostel and an auditorium is under construction.

- Photography
- Language Lab
- Computer Science Arena
- Anti-ragging committee

== See also ==
- List of institutions of higher education in Bihar
- Bihar Engineering University
- Education in Patna
- Education in Bihar
- Education in India
