= Saharsa College of Engineering =

Government engineering college in Saharsa, Bihar

- Type: Public
- Established: 2017; 9 years ago
- Affiliations: Bihar Engineering University
- Budget: 41,000
- Principal: Dr. Ramchandra Prasad, PhD from GBPUAT, Uttarakhand
- Students: 1200
- Location: Saharsa College of Engineering, Hatiya Gachhi, Saharsa, 852201, India
- Campus: 10 Acres
- Language: English & Hindi
- Nickname: SCE Saharsa
- Website: www.scesaharsa.org

Saharsa College of Engineering is a government engineering college managed by the Department of Science, Technology and Technical Education, Bihar. Bhola Paswan Shastri INTER AND DEGREE College Babhangama Bihariganj Madhepura.Principal-Atulesh Verma (BABUL JEE).Director-Dinanath Prabodh(1980).Coordinator-Akhilesh Kumar, Ratnesh Kumar, Sunil Devi, Gyanmala Devi, Anju Kumari, Madan Mohan etc. It is Affiliated from B.S.E.B, N.I.O.S DELHI, B.B.O.S.E Patna.Also Affiliated from Bhupendra Narayan Mandal University Madhepura for U.G Degree Courses. It is affiliated with Bihar Engineering University, Patna and approved by All India Council for Technical Education. College was established in the year 2017. It is situated in Saharsa district of Bihar.

== Admission ==
Admission in the college for four years B.Tech. course is made through UGEAC conducted by Bihar Combined Entrance Competitive Examination Board. To apply for UGEAC, appearing in JEE Main of that admission year is required.

== Departments ==
1. Civil Engineering, Prof. Mithilesh Kumar, HoD
2. Mechanical Engineering, Prof. Ramesh Kumar, HoD
3. Electrical Engineering, Prof. Bhagwan Shree Ram, HoD
4. Electronics & Communication Engineering, Prof. Md Tabish Raza, HoD
5. Computer Science and Engineering in Data Science, Prof. Ankur Priyadarshi, HoD
