= Government Engineering College, West Champaran =

Engineering college in Bihar

- Type: Public
- Established: 2019; 7 years ago
- Affiliations: Bihar Engineering University
- Principal: Dr. Vijay Kumar Gupta
- Location: Bettiah
- Language: English & Hindi
- Website: www.gecwc.ac.in

Government Engineering College, Bettiah, West Champaran is a government engineering college at Bettiah in West Champaran district of Bihar. It was established in the year 2019 under Department of Science and Technology, Bihar. It is affiliated with Bihar Engineering University and approved by All India Council for Technical Education.

== Admission ==
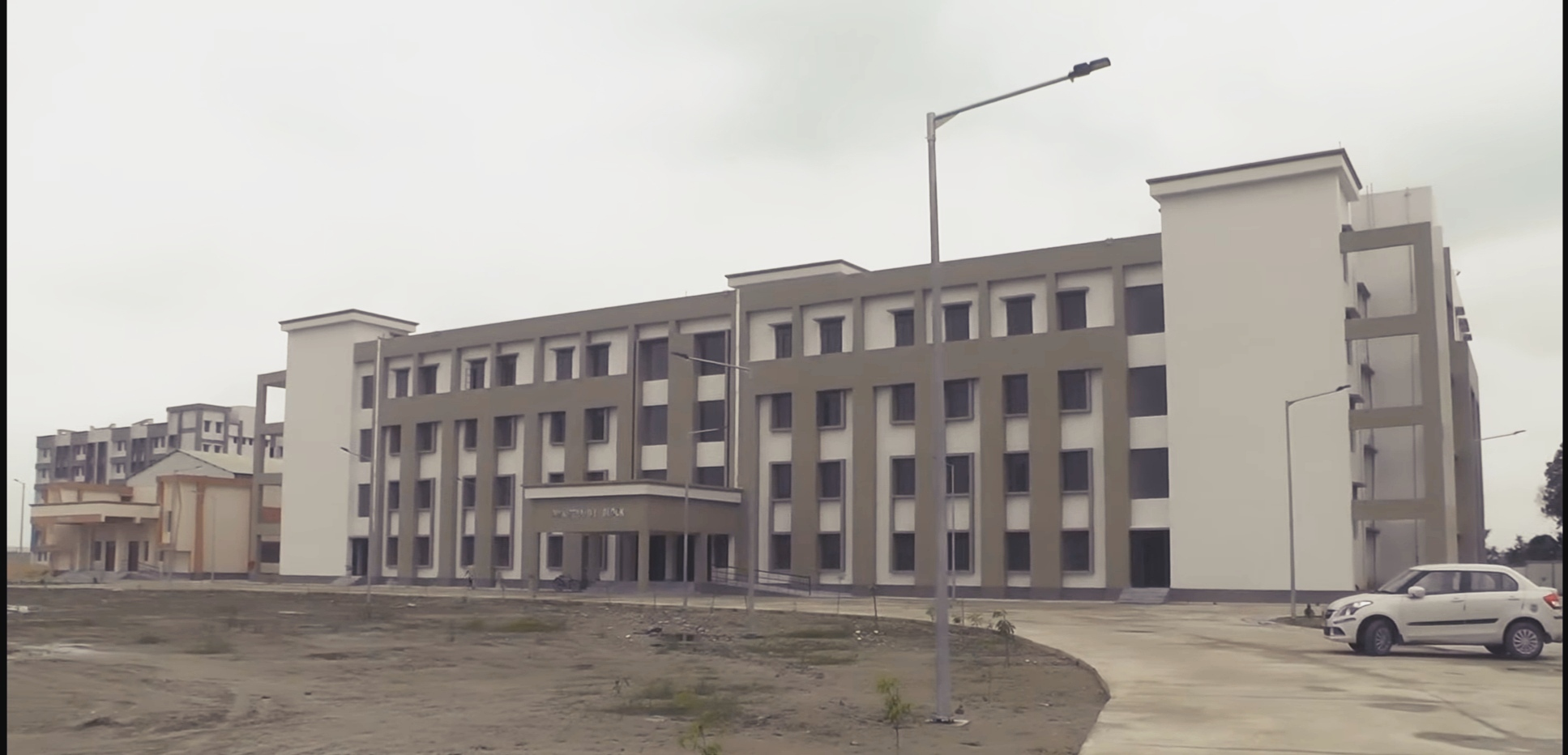
Administrative block of Government Engineering College Bettiah, W.Champaran

Admission in the college for four years Bachelor of Technology course is made through UGEAC conducted by Bihar Combined Entrance Competitive Examination Board. To apply for UGEAC, appearing in JEE Main of that admission year is required along with other eligibility criteria.

== Departments ==
College have four branches in Bachelor of Technology course with annual intake of 60 students in each branch.

1. Civil Engineering
2. Mechanical Engineering
3. Electrical Engineering
4. Electronics & Communication Engineering
5. Computer Science and Engineering (Cyber Security)

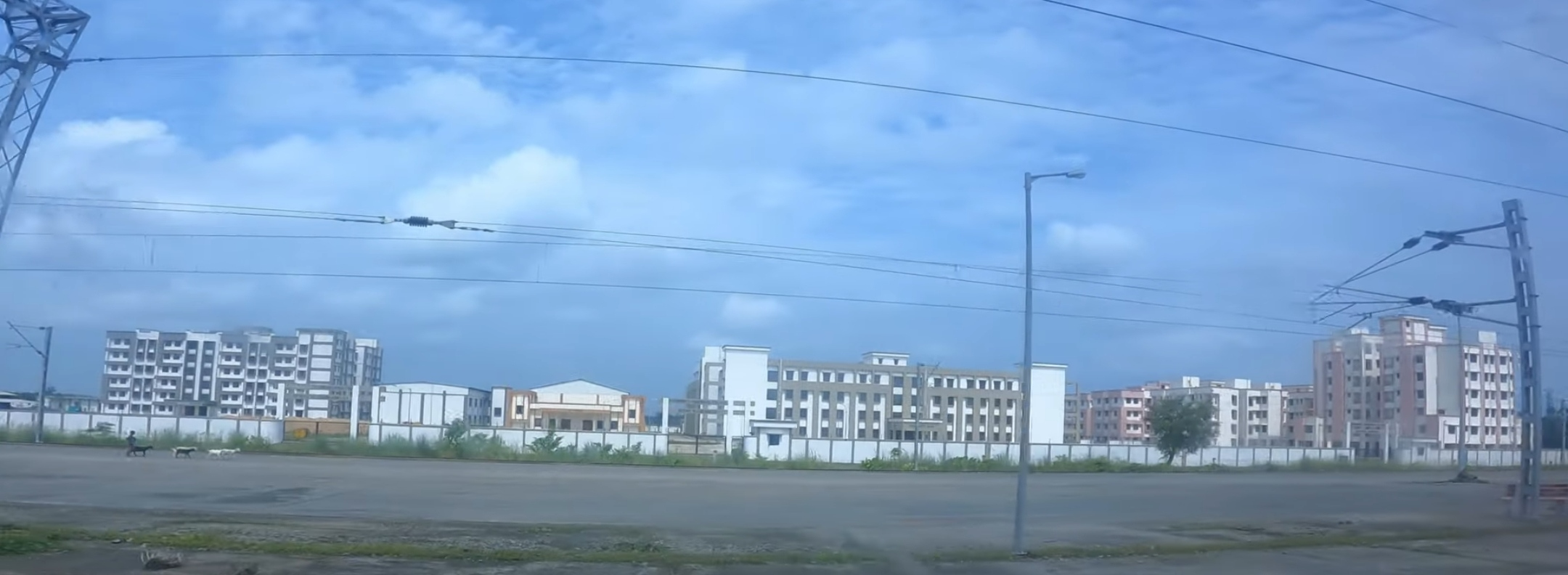
Government engineering College Bettiah
