= Darbhanga College of Engineering =

Engineering college in Bihar, India

Coordinates: 26.1802°N 85.8637°E

- Other name: DCE Darbhanga
- Former name: JMIT Darbhanga
- Established: 2008 (18 years ago)
- Academic affiliations: Bihar Engineering University
- Principal: Prof. Chandan Kumar
- Faculty: 52
- Administrative staff: 60
- Students: 1100
- Location: Darbhanga, Bihar, India
- Campus: Urban
- Approvals: AICTE
- Website: www.dcedarbhanga.ac.in

Darbhanga College of Engineering (DCE Darbhanga) is a government-owned engineering (B.Tech.) college in Bihar, India. It was inaugurated by the Chief Minister of Bihar, Nitish Kumar, in 2008. It is affiliated with the Bihar Engineering University (BEU), Patna and approved by the AICTE. The college is administered by Department of Science and Technology, Bihar.

== History ==
It was previously known as Jagannath Mishra Institute of Technology (JMIT). In 2008 it reopened with a new name, Darbhanga College of Engineering, under Lalit Narayan Mithila University (LNMU). In 2011, it became a member of the AKU Family till 15 March 2023. From 15 March 2023 it became a member of BEU Family. The owners of this property were Late Sri Jyoti Prasad Singh Ji, landlord of HariharPur Estate who constructed it in 1935. after the great earthquake of Bihar in 1934, this was constructed by M/s Bhambhri & Co. Ahmedabad and is an earthquake-proof construction. It changed hands in 1982 due to the continuous security threat issues for then JMIT.

The college offers courses in computer science and engineering, Mechanical engineering, electrical and electronics engineering, and civil engineering. It includes 12 seats for "Lateral Entry" for all trades, especially for diploma holder students.

== Admission ==
From 2019 and onwards admissions will be taken by national level exam JEE (Mains) merit list. Students desirous to take admissions must appear in IIT-JEE (Mains) Exam that is conducted by National Testing Agency (NTA).

Earlier Undergraduate admissions are done through the Bihar Combined Entrance Competitive Examination (BCECE) conducting by Bihar Combined Entrance Competitive Examination Board, Under Bihar Combined Entrance Competitive Examination Act, 1995 of Bihar government. The Entrance examination is of two stages: First stage is the screening test or preliminary test. The screened candidates have to appear in the main examination (second stage). Based on the merit list in the second stage, successful candidates allotted seats in different engineering colleges of Bihar.

For Diploma holder students it conducts special exam named "Lateral entry" from April to July. Only one written exam is conducted and the students directly get admitted to second year.

== Degree and Courses ==
=== Bachelor of Technology (B.Tech.) ===
1. Civil Engineering
2. Computer Science and Engineering
3. Computer Science and Engineering(Cybersecurity) ---Better than C.S.E
4. Electrical and Electronics Engineering
5. Mechanical Engineering
6. Fire Technology and Safety

=== Master of Technology (M. Tech.) ===
1. Power systems

== See also ==
- List of institutions of higher education in Bihar
- Education in Patna
- Education in Bihar
- Education in India
