= Government Engineering College, Gopalganj =

Government engineering college in Gopalganj, Bihar

- Type: Public
- Established: 2019; 7 years ago
- Affiliations: Bihar Engineering University
- Principal: Ram Sagar Singh
- Language: English & Hindi
- Website: www.gecgopalganj.org

Government Engineering College, Gopalganj is a government engineering college in Gopalganj, Bihar. It was established in the year 2019 under Department of Science and Technology, Bihar. It is affiliated with Bihar Engineering University and approved by All India Council for Technical Education.

== Admission ==
Admission in the college for four years Bachelor of Technology course is made through UGEAC conducted by Bihar Combined Entrance Competitive Examination Board. To apply for UGEAC, appearing in JEE Main of that admission year is required along with other eligibility criteria.

== Departments ==
College have three branches in Bachelor of Technology course with following annual intake.

Courses in B.Tech	Annual intake of students
Civil Engineering	60
Electrical Engineering	60
Mechanical Engineering	30
COMPUTER Sc. & Engg. (IOT & Cyber Security including Block Chain Technology)	60
COMPUTER Sc. & Engg. (AI)	60
Aeronautical Engineering	30
ELECTRONICS ENGG. (VLSI DESIGN & TECH	60
