= Purnea College of Engineering =

Engineering college in Bihar

- Type: Government
- Established: 2017; 9 years ago
- Affiliation: Bihar Engineering University
- Principal: Prof. Manoj Kumar(Electrical)
- Undergraduates: 960
- Language: English & Hindi
- Approvals: AICTE
- Website: www.pcepurnia.org

Purnea College of Engineering is a government-owned engineering college in Purnia district of Bihar, India. It is managed by the Department of Science and Technology, Bihar. College is affiliated with Bihar Engineering University and approved by All India Council for Technical Education. The college was established in 2017.

== Admission ==
Admission in the college for four years B.Tech. course is made through UGEAC conducted by Bihar Combined Entrance Competitive Examination Board. To apply for UGEAC, appearing in JEE Main of that admission year is required.

== Branches ==
College have total of six branches in Bachelor of Technology degree.

Branch	Annual intake of students
Civil Engineering	60
Mechanical Engineering	60
Electrical Engineering	60
Electronic and Communication Engineering	60
Computer Science Engineering	30
CSE with Artificial Intelligence	30

== College Campus ==
The campus is situated on the Western side of NH-31 road with East facing, and spread over an area of 10 acres. The campus comprises the following area :

- Academic that includes department offices, lecture Classes, seminar hall, Lab.
- Central Library, Gym, Students Cafeteria
- Student Residential Boys Hostel (A. P. J. Abdul Kalam, C. V. Raman), Girls Hostel (Mother Teresa)
- Faculty and Staff Residential
- Student Recreational Area that includes Volleyball ground, Badminton courts.
