= Government Engineering College, Lakhisarai =

Government engineering college in Bihar

GOVERNMENT ENGINEERING COLLEGE, LAKHISARAI
- Type: Public
- Established: 2019; 7 years ago
- Affiliations: Bihar Engineering University
- Principal: Dr. Bimlesh Kumar
- Location: Lakhisarai, India
- Campus: Rural
- Language: English & Hindi
- Website: http://geclakhisarai.ac.in/

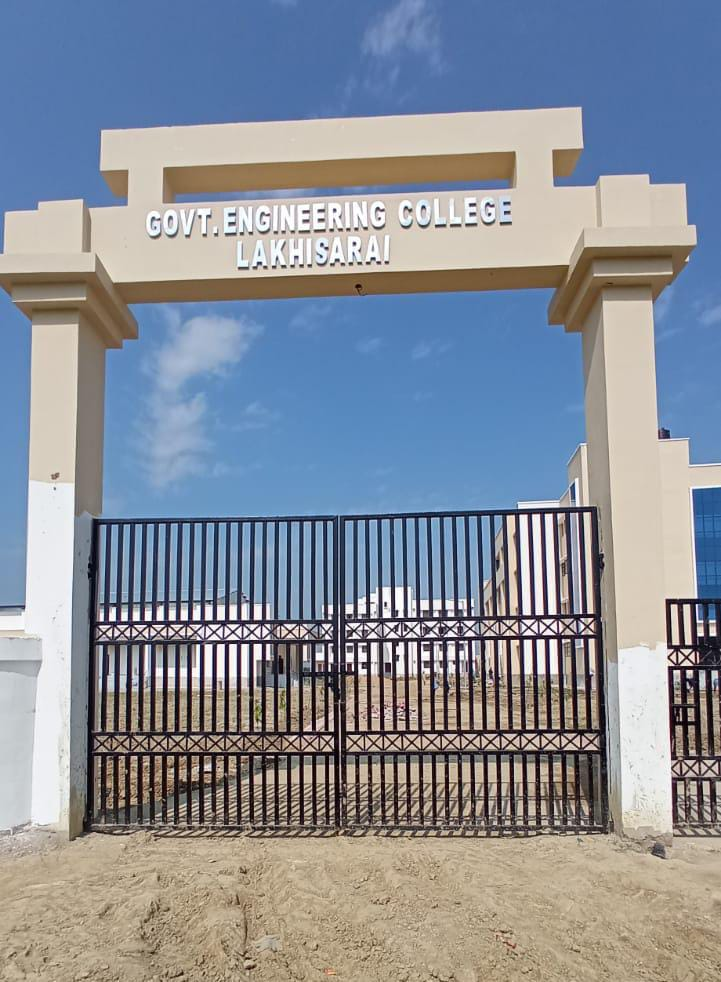
Government Engineering College, Lakhisarai

Government Engineering College, Lakhisarai is a government engineering college in Lakhisarai district of Bihar, India. It was established in the year 2019 under Department of Science and Technology, Bihar. It is affiliated with Bihar Engineering University and approved by All India Council for Technical Education.

== Admission ==
Admission in the college for four years Bachelor of Technology course is made through UGEAC conducted by Bihar Combined Entrance Competitive Examination Board. To apply for UGEAC, appearing in JEE Main of that admission year is required along with other eligibility criteria.

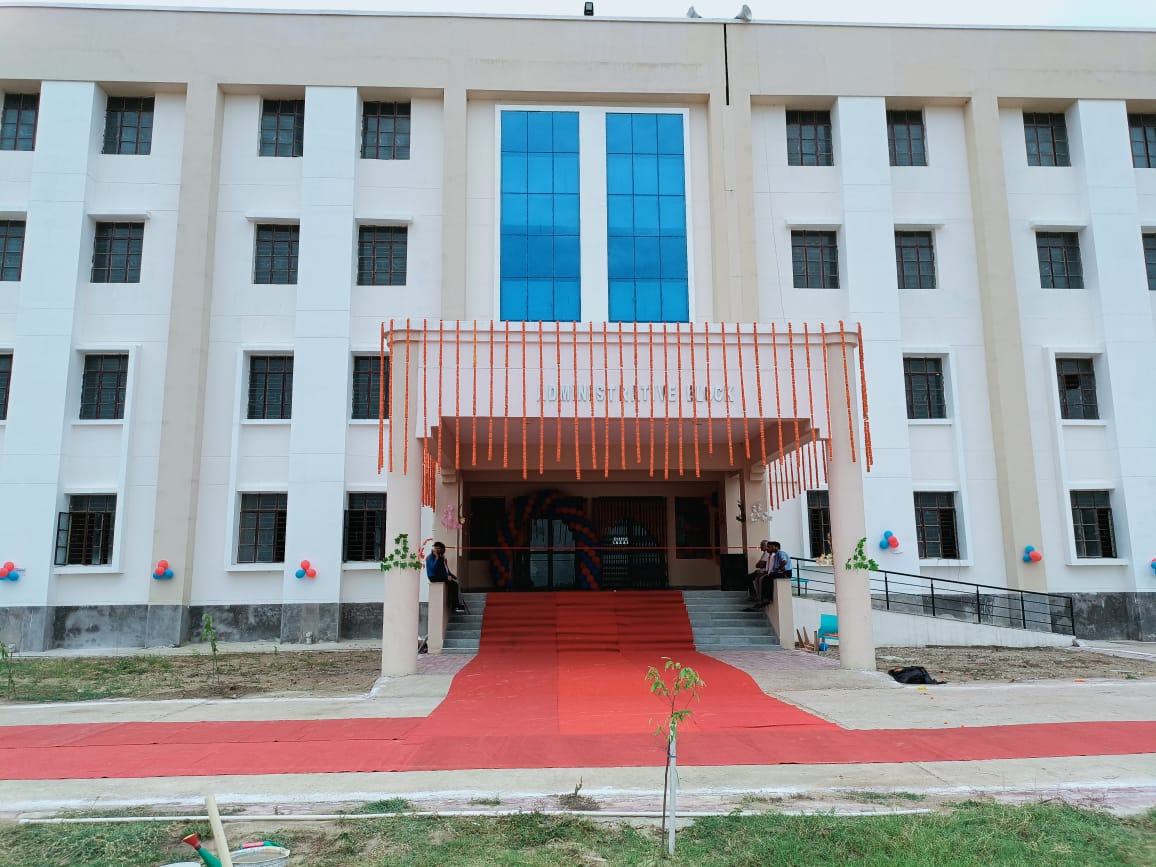
ACADEMIC BUILDING

== Departments ==
College has five branches in Bachelor of Technology course with following annual intake.

Branches	Annual intake of students
Civil Engineering	120
Mechanical Engineering	60
Electrical Engineering	60
Computer Science & Engineering (A.I.)	60
Computer Science & Engineering (Data Science)	60

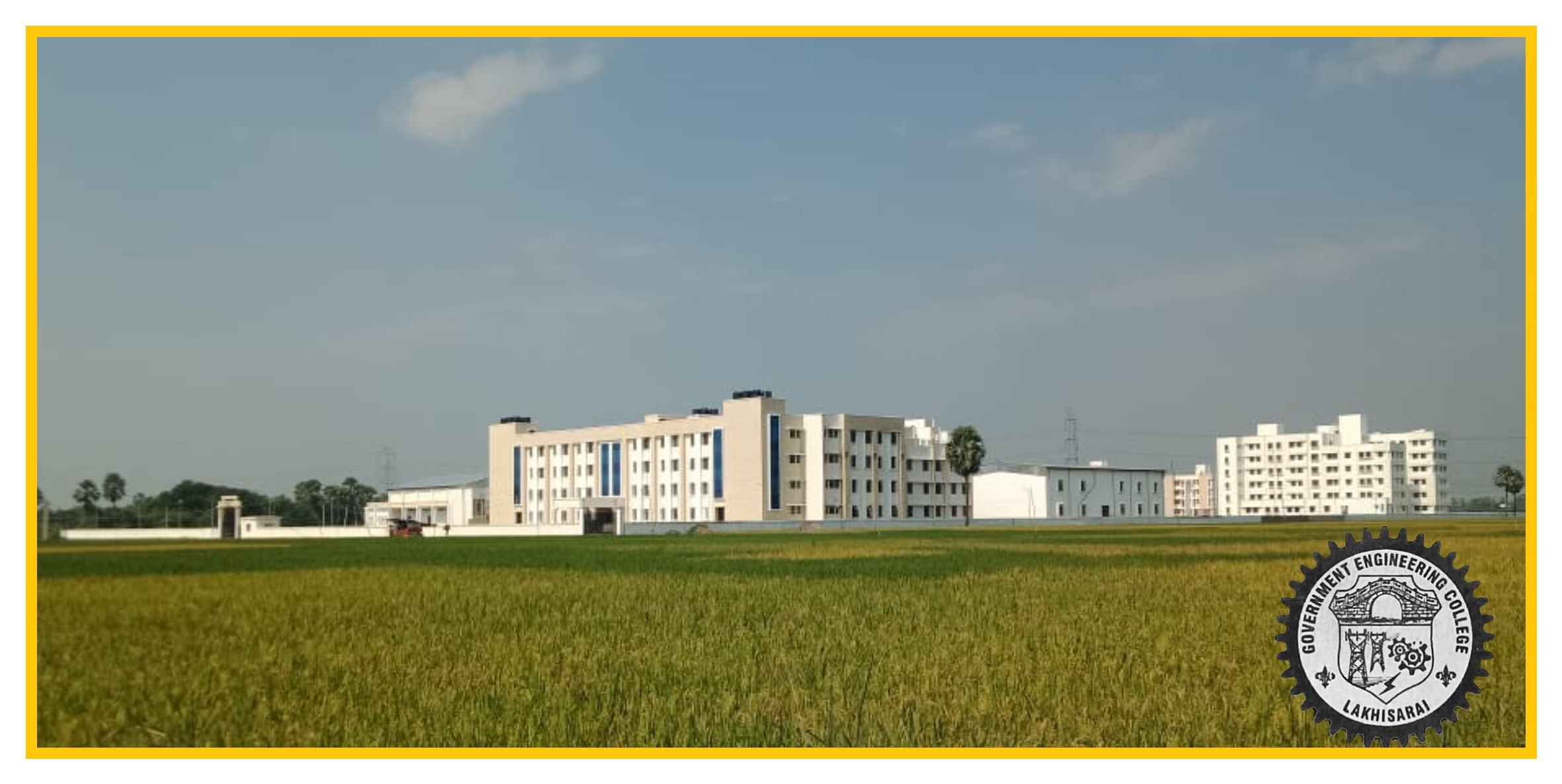
MAIN CAMPUS OF GEC LAKHISARAI
