= Sitamarhi Institute of Technology =

Engineering college in Bihar

- Motto: विद्या ददाति विनयम्
- Motto in English: With knowledge comes modesty
- Type: Fully Govt.funded
- Established: 2016; 10 years ago
- Affiliations: Bihar Engineering University
- Principal: Dr. Sunil Kumar
- Location: Sitamarhi, India
- Language: English, Hindi & Maithili
- Website: www.sitsitamarhi.ac.in
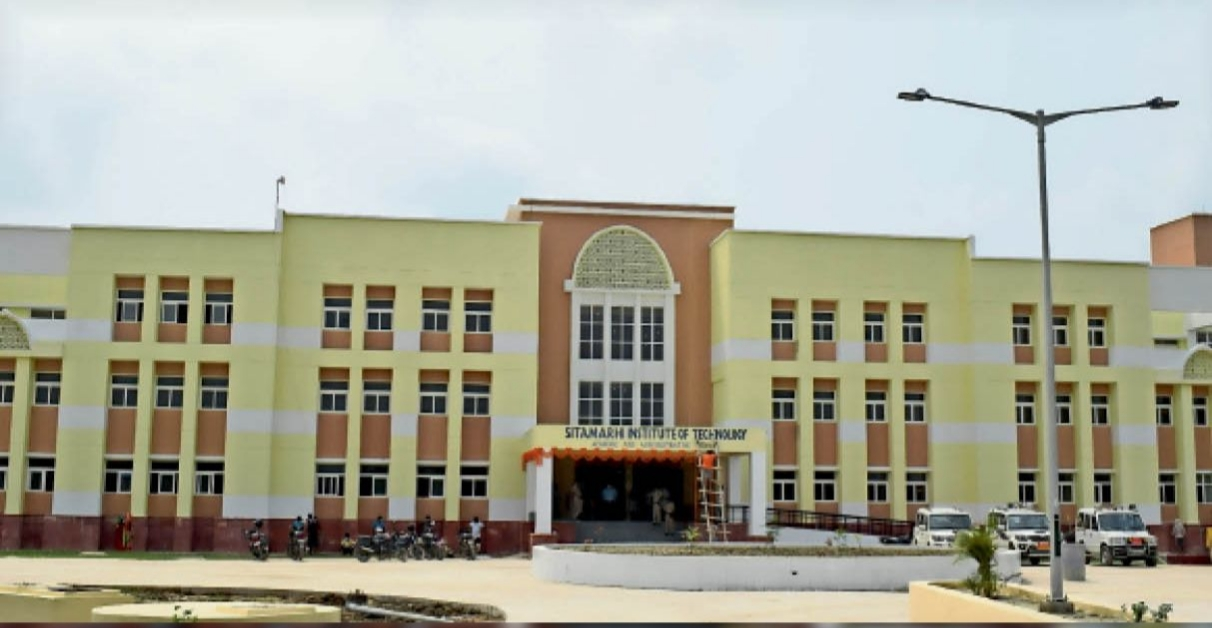

Sitamarhi Institute of Technology is a government engineering college under Department of Science and Technology, Bihar. It is situated in Sitamarhi district of Bihar. Institute is affiliated with Bihar Engineering University. It was established in the year 2016.

== Location ==
Institute is situated in sitamarhi district of northern Bihar. campus is located around 140 km away from capital city of patna. institute is well connected by road and railways from Patna, Muzaffarpur and Darbhanga. Nearest airport is Darbhanga which is around 75 km from the campus.

== Admission ==
Admission in the institute for four years Bachelor of Technology course is made through UGEAC conducted by Bihar Combined Entrance Competitive Examination Board. UGEAC is based on the rank list of JEE Main conducted by National Testing Agency.

== Departments ==
The institute has five departments.

1. Department of Civil Engineering
2. Department of Computer Science & Engineering
3. Department of Mechanical Engineering
4. Department of Electrical Engineering
5. Department of Applied Science and Humanities

Institute offers four branches in Bachelor of Technology (B.Tech) course with annual intake of 60 students in each branch.

1. B.Tech in Civil Engineering
2. B.Tech in Computer Science & Engineering
3. B.Tech in Mechanical Engineering
4. B.Tech in Electrical Engineering
