= Loknayak Jai Prakash Institute of Technology =

Government engineering college in Chhapra, Bihar

- लोकनायक जय प्रकाश प्रौद्योगिकी संस्थान
- Type: Public Institute of Technology
- Established: 8 September 2012 (13 years ago)
- Affiliations: All India Council for Technical Education
- Academic affiliations: Bihar Engineering University
- Principal: Mithilesh Kumar Singh
- Mentor Institute: Indian Institute of Technology Patna
- Faculty: 34
- Students: 1300-1400
- Location: Chhapra, Bihar, 841302, India; 25°46′55″N 84°47′17″E
- Campus: 45 acres (0.2 km^{2})
- Colours: Saffron
- Nicknames: LNJPIT, Chapra Engineering College
- Website: www.lnjpitchapra.ac.in

Loknayak Jai Prakash Institute of Technology (LNJPIT), is a government engineering college in Bihar. It is managed by the Department of Science and Technology, Bihar. It is approved and recognized by the All India Council for Technical Education, it is one of TEQUIP-III colleges funded and taken care directly by central govt and is affiliated to the Bihar Engineering University of Patna. It is named after the independence activist and political leader Jayprakash Narayan. The main campus of this college is located on side of National Highway 19 (also known as Chapra–Patna Highway) on the outskirts of Saran District, 6 kilometers from Chhapra, located on the banks of the Ganges River.

== Departments ==
- Mechanical Engineering
- Civil Engineering
- Computer Science and Engineering
- Electrical Engineering
- Food Engineering
- Physics
- Chemistry
- Mathematics
- Humanities

== Degree programs ==
=== Bachelor of Technology (B.Tech.) ===
LNJPIT has the following branches at the Bachelor of Technology level:

Departmental Courses in B.Tech. offered	Intake and seats available
B.Tech. Civil Engineering	60 (General Entrance Seats) +12 (Side Entrance)
B.Tech. Computer Science and Engineering	120 (General Entrance Seats) +12 (Side Entrance)
B.Tech. Electrical Engineering	60 (General Entrance Seats) +12 (Side Entrance)
B.Tech. Mechanical Engineering	60 (General Entrance Seats) +12 (Side Entrance)

=== Master of Technology (M.Tech.) ===
LNJPIT has the following branches at the Master of Engineering level:

- Thermal Engineering (Under Mechanical Engineering Department)

== Admissions ==
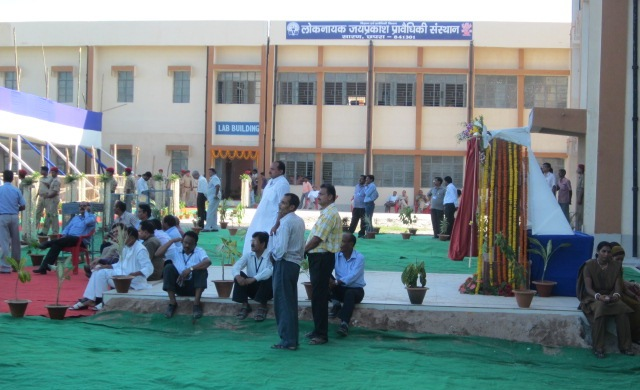
Loknayak Jai Prakash Institute of Technology - 2012

From 2019 onwards, admissions in the first year of state government engineering colleges of Bihar is based on performance in JEE-Main. The BCECE Board conducts Under Graduate Engineering Admission Counselling (UGEAC) for this purpose.

For lateral entry in the second year, Diploma in Engineering is required. The merit list is prepared on the basis of performance in BCECE(LE), an examination conducted by BCECE Board.

== Facilities ==
=== College facilities ===
- Computer Science Arena
- Wifi
- Restaurant
- Hostel Mess
- Guest house
- Playground

=== Library ===
Loknayak Jai Prakash Institute of Technology has a library.

=== Hostel ===
The institute is residential in nature. This institute has five boys' hostels and two girl's hostels. The boys' hostels can accommodate approximately 800 students while the girl's have a capacity of around 300-400 students. Guest house for parents and others located on campus.

== See also ==
- Indian Institute of Technology Patna
- Aryabhatta Knowledge University
- All India Council for Technical Education
- Education in India
