= Government Engineering College, Madhubani =

Engineering college in Bihar

- Type: Public
- Established: 2019; 7 years ago
- Affiliations: Bihar Engineering University
- Principal: Dr. Vikash Kumar
- Language: English & Hindi
- Website: www.gecmadhubani.ac.in

Government Engineering College, Madhubani is a government engineering college in Madhubani district of Bihar, India Nnar Pandaul On the Madhubani-Sakri Highway. It was established in the year 2019 under Department of Science and Technology, Bihar. It is affiliated with Bihar Engineering University, Patna and approved by All India Council for Technical Education.

== Admission ==
Admission in the college for four years Bachelor of Technology course is made through UGEAC conducted by Bihar Combined Entrance Competitive Examination Board. To apply for UGEAC, appearing in JEE Main of that admission year is required along with other eligibility criteria.

== Departments ==
College has three branches in Bachelor of Technology course with following annual intake.

Branches	Annual intake of students
Civil Engineering	120
Mechanical Engineering	60
Electrical Engineering	60

|Computer science Engineering |60 |} |Computer science engineering (IOT) |60 |}
