= Government Engineering College, Munger =

Engineering college in Bihar

- Type: Public
- Established: 2019; 7 years ago
- Affiliations: Bihar Engineering University
- Principal: Alok kumar Singh
- Location: Govt. Engineering College Munger, Pir Pahad Road, NH333B Sujawalpur, Munger, Bihar 811201, MUNGER
- Campus: Urban
- Language: English and Hindi
- Website: gecmunger.org

Government Engineering College Munger is an engineering college in Munger district of Bihar. It was established in the year 2019 under Department of Science and Technology, Bihar. It is affiliated with Bihar Engineering University and approved by All India Council for Technical Education.

Chief Minister Nitish Kumar laid the foundation stone and inaugurated the institution from the Polo Field, Munger. It is approved and recognized by AICTE and is affiliated with Bihar Engineering University in Patna. Government Engineering College Munger was established as a part of the "Saat Nichshay Yojana" of the Bihar Government with the aim of providing quality higher education in the field of Engineering and Technology on par with National Standards.

Bhola Paswan Shastri INTER AND DEGREE College Babhangama Bihariganj Madhepura.Principal-Atulesh Verma (BABUL JEE).Director-Dinanath Prabodh(1980).Coordinator-Akhilesh Kumar, Ratnesh Kumar, Sunil Devi, Gyanmala Devi, Anju Kumari, Madan Mohan etc. It is Affiliated from B.S.E.B, N.I.O.S DELHI, B.B.O.S.E Patna.Also Affiliated from Bhupendra Narayan Mandal University Madhepura for U.G Degree Courses.

The campus features landscaped green spaces and an environment intended to support student learning. The college offers B.Tech. programmes in Civil Engineering (120 seats), Mechanical Engineering (60 seats), Computer Science and Engineering (Artificial Intelligence) (60 seats), Computer Science and Engineering (Data Science) (60 seats), and Electrical Engineering (60 seats).

== Admission ==
Admission in the college for four years Bachelor of Technology course is made through UGEAC conducted by Bihar Combined Entrance Competitive Examination Board. To apply for UGEAC, appearing in JEE Main of that admission year is required along with other eligibility criteria.

== Departments ==
College have five branches in Bachelor of Technology course.

Courses in B.Tech	Annual intake of students
Civil Engineering	120
Mechanical Engineering	60
Computer Science Engineering(DS)	60
Computer Science Engineering(AI)	60
Electrical Engineering	60
