= Rashtrakavi Ramdhari Singh Dinkar College of Engineering =

Government engineering college in Begusarai, Bihar

- Motto: Work is worship
- Type: Public
- Established: 2016; 10 years ago
- Affiliations: Bihar Engineering University
- Principal: Dr. Abhishek Sharma
- Website: www.rrsdcebgs.ac.in

Rashtrakavi Ramdhari Singh Dinkar College of Engineering (RRSDCE), is a government engineering college under the Department of Science and Technology, Bihar that opened in 2016. The college is named after the poet Ramdhari Singh Dinkar. It is in Begusarai, Bihar and is affiliated with Bihar Engineering University, Patna and approved by the All India Council for Technical Education.

== Admission ==
Admission in the college is done through the Bihar Combined Entrance Competitive Examination Board (BCECEB). To participate in the counselling process of the Board, students must have appeared in Joint Entrance Examination – Main of that admission year.

== Disciplines ==
1. Chemical Engineering
2. Computer Science & Engineering
3. Electrical & Electronics Engineering
4. Mechanical Engineering
5. Civil Engineering
6. Computer Science with Data Science

== Departments ==
- Physics
- Chemistry
- Mathematics
- Humanities
