= Government Engineering College, Jehanabad =

Government engineering college in Jehanabad, Bihar

- Type: Public
- Established: 2019; 7 years ago
- Affiliations: Bihar Engineering University
- Principal: Dr. Dwarka Das Neema
- Language: English & Hindi
- Website: www.gecjehanabad.ac.in

Government Engineering College, Jehanabad is a government engineering college in Jehanabad district of Bihar. It was established in the year 2019 under Department of Science and Technology, Bihar. It is affiliated with Bihar Engineering University and approved by All India Council for Technical Education.

== Admission ==
Admission in the college for four years Bachelor of Technology course is made through UGEAC conducted by Bihar Combined Entrance Competitive Examination Board. To apply for UGEAC, appearing in JEE Main of that admission year is required along with other eligibility criteria.

== Departments ==
College have three branches in Bachelor of Technology course.

Courses in B.Tech	Annual intake of students
Civil Engineering	120
Electrical Engineering	60
Mechanical Engineering	60
