= Government Engineering College, Sheikhpura =

Engineering college in Bihar, India

- Motto: विज्ञानं विधिं विवृणुते
- Type: Public
- Established: 2019; 7 years ago
- Affiliations: Bihar Engineering University
- Principal: Dr. Jaishanker Prasad Keshari
- Language: English & Hindi
- Website: www.gecsheikhpura.org.in

Government Engineering College, Sheikhpura is a government engineering college in Sheikhpura district of Bihar. It was established in the year 2019 under Department of Science and Technology, Bihar. It is affiliated with Bihar Engineering University and approved by All India Council for Technical Education.

== Admission ==
Admission in the college for four years Bachelor of Technology course is made through UGEAC conducted by Bihar Combined Entrance Competitive Examination Board. To apply for UGEAC, appearing in JEE Main of that admission year is required along with other eligibility criteria.

== Departments ==
College had four branches till 2022 in Bachelor of Technology courses with annual intake of 60 students in each branch.

1. Computer Science Engineering
2. Civil Engineering
3. Mechanical Engineering
4. Electrical Engineering
5. Electronics & Communication Engineering

In 2023, another branch Computer Science and Engineering was added with intake capacity of 120 students per batch.

== Students Club ==
1. Exletra - The Techno-Cultural Club of GEC Sheikhpura.
2. Photography Club
3. Sports Club (Sheikhpura Premier League, SPL)
4. Literature club
