= Government Engineering College, Samastipur =

Engineering college in Bihar

- राजकीय अभियंत्रण महाविद्यालय, समस्तीपुर
- Other name: GEC SAMASTIPUR
- Type: Public
- Established: 2019; 7 years ago
- Affiliations: Bihar Engineering University
- Principal: Dr. R. M.Tugnayat
- Campus: Rural
- Language: English & Hindi
- Website: www.gecsamastipur.org.in

Government Engineering College, Samastipur is an engineering college under Department of Science and Technology, Bihar. It is situated in Samastipur district of Bihar. This college is affiliated with Bihar Engineering University. It was established in 2019.

== Admission ==
Admission in the college for four years Bachelor of Technology course is made through UGEAC conducted by Bihar Combined Entrance Competitive Examination Board. UGEAC is based on the rank list of JEE Main conducted by National Testing Agency.

== Branches ==
College offers three branches in Bachelor of Technology (B.Tech.) course with annual intake of 60 students in each branch.

1. B.Tech. in Civil Engineering
2. B.Tech. in Mechanical Engineering
3. B.Tech. in Electrical Engineering
4. B.Tech. in Electronic & Communication Engineering
5. B.Tech. in Computer Sc. & Engineering With Specialization in Cyber Security
6. B.Tech. in Computer Sc. & Engineering With Specialization in AI & ML
