= Government Engineering College, Vaishali =

Government engineering college in Hajipur, Bihar

Coordinates: 25.6925°N 85.3521°E

- GECV
- Type: Government Engineering college
- Established: 2018 (8 years ago)
- Affiliations: Bihar Engineering University
- Principal: Ashish Srivastava
- Faculty: 30
- Administrative staff: 15
- Students: 815
- Location: Vaishali, Bihar, India
- Campus: Rural
- Nickname: GECV
- Website: www.gecvaishali.ac.in

Government Engineering College, Vaishali (GECV) is a technical institute established in 2018 by the Government of Bihar under the Department of Science and Technology, Bihar. It is approved by AICTE and is affiliated with Bihar Engineering University. The institute offers full-time Bachelor of Technology (B.Tech.) degree programs. It started its first academic session (2018–19) in temporary campus from the campus of Government Polytechnic College, Vaishali. The institute offers full-time Bachelor of Technology (B.Tech.) degree programs in disciplines of science and technology.

== Departments ==
GECV offers undergraduate courses in four streams of engineering:

Departmental Courses in B.Tech. offered	Intake and seats available
B.Tech. Electronics and Communication Engineering	60 (Normal Entry Seats)
B.Tech. Electrical Engineering	60 (Normal Entry Seats)
B.Tech. Mechanical Engineering	60 (Normal Entry Seats)
B.Tech. Civil Engineering	60 (Normal Entry Seats)

== Admission ==
Till 2018: The Bihar Combined Entrance Competitive Examination Board(BCECEB) conducts an exam based on the Merit List of the Bihar Combined Entrance Competitive Examination successful candidates appear in the counseling at the allotted college during online counseling procedure

From 2019 onwards admissions in state engineering colleges of Bihar will be based on JEE mains rank. Students have to fill the application form on the BCECE Board website for admission.

== Campus and location ==
GECV Temporary campus is located at Government Polytechnic Campus, Fatehpur, Afzalpur Road, Pochakmaruf, Goraul, Vaishali, Bihar – 844118. Permanent campus to be shifted by 25th MAY at chaksikandar, Hajipur, Vaishali

== See also ==
- List of institutions of higher education in Bihar
- Bihar Engineering University
- Education in Patna
- Education in Bihar
- Education in India
