= Shri Phanishwar Nath Renu Engineering College =

Engineering college in Bihar

- Former names: Government Engineering College, Araria
- Type: Public
- Established: 2019; 7 years ago
- Affiliations: Bihar Engineering University
- Principal: Aatmaram Gupta
- Location: Simaraha, Araria, Araria, Bihar, India; 26°11′55.9″N 87°19′17.6″E
- Language: English & Hindi
- Approvals: AICTE
- Website: spnrecararia.ac.in//

Shri Phanishwar Nath Renu Engineering College formerly known as Government Engineering College, Araria is a government engineering college in Araria district of Bihar. It was established in the year 2019 under Department of Science and Technology, Bihar and was named after writer Phanishwar Nath Renu. It is affiliated with Bihar Engineering University and approved by All India Council for Technical Education.

== Admission ==
Admission in the college for four years Bachelor of Technology course is made through UGEAC conducted by Bihar Combined Entrance Competitive Examination Board. To apply for UGEAC, appearing in JEE Main of that admission year is required along with other eligibility criteria.

== Departments ==
The college has six branches in Bachelor of Technology.
