= Government Engineering College, Nawada =

Government engineering college in Nawada, Bihar

- Type: Public
- Established: 2019; 7 years ago
- Affiliations: Bihar Engineering University
- Principal: Roshan Kumar
- Language: English & Hindi
- Website: www.gecnawada.org.in

Government Engineering College, Nawada is a government engineering college in Nawada district of Bihar. It was established in the year 2019 under Department of Science and Technology, Bihar. It is affiliated with Bihar Engineering University and approved by All India Council for Technical Education.

== Admission ==
Admission in the college for four years Bachelor of Technology course is made through UGEAC conducted by Bihar Combined Entrance Competitive Examination Board. To apply for UGEAC, appearing in JEE Main of that admission year is required along with other eligibility criteria.

== Departments ==
College have five branches in Bachelor of Technology course with annual intake of 120 in Civil & 60 students in each branch.

1. Civil Engineering
2. Mechanical Engineering
3. Electrical Engineering
4. Electronics & Communication Engineering
5. COMPUTER Sc. & Engg
