= Gaya College of Engineering =

Government engineering college in Gaya, Bihar, India

- Former name: Magadh Engineering College
- Type: Public Engineering Institute
- Established: 1958 (68 years ago)
- Accreditation: NBA
- Affiliations: Bihar Engineering University
- Principal: Dr. Dwarka Das Neema
- Dean: Dr. Alok Mishra
- Faculty: 46
- Administrative staff: 150
- Undergraduates: 1480
- Location: Sri Krishna Nagar P.O Nagariyana via Buniyadganj - 823003 Gaya, Bihar, India; 24.9001°N 85.0466°E
- Campus: Rural 87 acres (35 ha) / 348,260 m^{2}
- Colours: White & Black
- Mascot: The Buddha
- Website: www.gcegaya.ac.in

Gaya College of Engineering (GCE) Gaya is a public technical institute in Gaya, Bihar, India . The institute operates under the administrative control of the Department of Science and Technology, Government of Bihar. It is affiliated with Bihar Engineering University (BEU), Patna, and is approved by the All India Council for Technical Education under the Ministry of Education, Government of India.

== History ==
The institute was established in 1981 under the chairmanship of Shri Ramashray Prasad Singh, former Minister, Government of Bihar. Its founding committee included several educationists, such as Dr. Jagdish Sharma (former Member of Parliament), Shri Jai Kumar Palit (MLA), Capt. Shah Jahan (MLA), Shri Gopal Prasad Singh (former District Board Chairman, Gaya), Dr. Shakeel Ahmad (former Principal, Mirza Ghalib College, Gaya, and former Vice-Chancellor, BRABU University, Muzaffarpur), and Prof. R.D. Singh.

Gaya College of Engineering is a government engineering institution administered by the Department of Science and Technology. It is approved by the All India Council for Technical Education and is affiliated to Bihar Engineering University, Patna. The institute was known as Magadh Engineering College from 1980 to 1994. It was later re-established as a public institution under its current name, Gaya College of Engineering. The college was formally inaugurated by the Hon’ble Chief Minister of Bihar, Shri Nitish Kumar, on 19 November 2008, in the presence of distinguished dignitaries, academicians, and public representatives during a ceremony held on the campus.

== Campus ==
The campus is situated at Bihar State Highway-4 in the Shrikrishnanagar locality on the outskirts of Gaya district, approximately fifteen kilometres from the main town. The college spreads across 87 acres and includes two academic buildings and a workshop. A canteen is available on the campus. A branch of Dakshin Bihar Gramin Bank operates here.

The institution provides residential facilities with five hostels, namely Buddha, Gautam, Tathagat, Parvati, and Sujata.

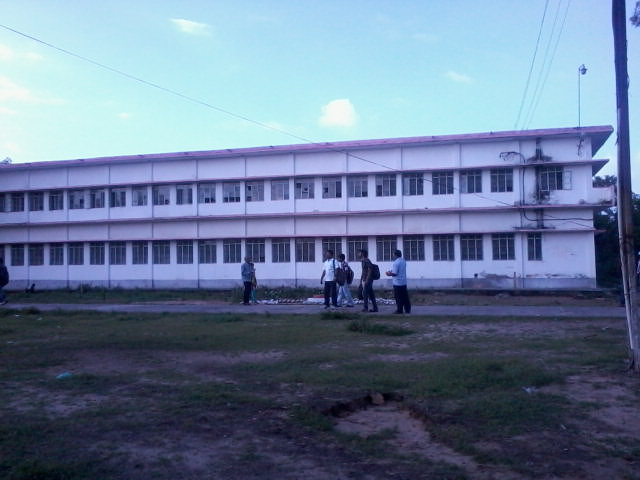
Academic Building

== Departments ==
=== Undergraduate ===
==== GCE offers undergraduate courses in five streams of engineering ====
Departmental Courses in B.Tech. offered	Intake and seats available
B.Tech in Mechanical Engineering	60 (Normal Entry Seats) +3 (Tuition Fee Waiver seats) +12 (Lateral Entry)
B.Tech in Computer Science and Engineering	120 (Normal Entry Seats) +3 (Tuition Fee Waiver seats) +12 (Lateral Entry)
B.Tech in Electrical and Electronics Engineering	90 (Normal Entry Seats) +3 (Tuition Fee Waiver seats) +12 (Lateral Entry)
B.Tech in Civil Engineering	90 (Normal Entry Seats) +3 (Tuition Fee Waiver seats) +12 (Lateral Entry)
B.Tech in Mathematics and Computing	60 (Normal Entry Seats)
Bachelor of Architecture	40 (Normal Entry seats)

=== Postgraduate ===
Gaya College of Engineering offers postgraduate programs in four engineering specializations. The courses and their specializations are as follows:

- M.Tech in Civil Engineering with specialization in Structural Engineering — 2-year program
- M.Tech in Electrical & Electronics Engineering with specialization in Very Large-Scale Integration — 2-year program (18 seats)
- M.Tech in Computer Science & Engineering with specialization in Cyber Security — 2-year program (18 seats)
- M.Tech in Mechanical Engineering with specialization in Manufacturing engineering — 2-year program

Admission to these postgraduate courses is based on performance in the Graduate Aptitude Test in Engineering (GATE) followed by the relevant counselling process.

=== Admission ===
Admission to Gaya College of Engineering is based on national and state-level entrance examinations. Candidates must qualify the Joint Entrance Examination, conducted by the National Testing Agency. Eligible students then participate in the Under Graduate Engineering Admission Counselling and Under Graduate Architecture Admission Counselling conducted by the Bihar Combined Entrance Competitive Examination Board for admission to the first year of the B.Tech and B.Arch programmes, based on their JEE merit rank. Diploma-holding candidates seeking lateral entry to the second year must qualify in the Lateral Entry (LE) admission test conducted by the Bihar Combined Entrance Competitive Examination Board

=== Library ===
The institute has a central [ibrary. In addition to textbooks, the library also offers technical magazines, previous year question papers, and digital learning support.

== Hostel and student life ==
The campus has five hostels—Buddha, Gautam, Tathagat, Parvati, and Sujata—providing accommodation for students from different regions of Bihar.

Students celebrate major festivals such as Diwali, Holi, Saraswati Puja, Janmashtami, Republic Day, and Independence Day with enthusiasm. These celebrations include cultural performances, puja events, lighting decorations, sports events, and community feasts, promoting unity and bonding among residents. The college organizes annual sports activities and competitions in cricket, football, volleyball, badminton, kabaddi, table tennis, and athletics, encouraging physical fitness and teamwork.

== Placement ==
GCE Gaya has a dedicated training and placement cell that actively works to connect students with leading companies and industries.

== See also ==
- List of institutions of higher education in Bihar
- Education in Bihar
- Education in India
