= Katihar Engineering College =

Government engineering college in Katihar, Bihar

- कटिहार अभियंत्रण महाविद्यालय
- Type: Public
- Established: 2016; 10 years ago
- Affiliations: Bihar Engineering University
- Principal: Smt. Ranjana Kumari
- Approvals: AICTE
- Website: keck.ac.in

Katihar Engineering College is a government engineering college affiliated with Bihar Engineering University, Patna, India. It is managed by the Department of Science and Technology, Government of Bihar.

== History ==
The college was established in 2016. It is situated at Katihar district.

== Admission ==
Admission in the Bachelor's in Technology course is made through UGEAC, conducted by Bihar Combined Entrance Competitive Examination Board.

== Departments ==
- Civil Engineering
- Mechanical Engineering
- Computer Science and Engineering
- Electrical and Electronic Engineering
- Food Processing Preservation Engineering
