= Government Engineering College, Bhojpur =

College in Bihar, India

- Other name: GEC Bhojpur
- Type: Government funded
- Established: 2018 (8 years ago)
- Academic affiliations: Bihar Engineering University
- Principal: Dr. Pankaj Kumar Srivastava
- Location: Ramna Maidan road, Near Maharaja College, Arrah, Bhojpur, Bihar, 802301, India; 25.5585°N 84.6645°E
- Campus: Urban
- Website: www.gecbhojpur.org
- Location within Bihar Location within India

Government Engineering College, Bhojpur is a government technical institute in Bihar, India. It is affiliated with Bihar Engineering University. The institute offers full-time Bachelor of Technology (B.Tech.) degree programs in Electrical Engineering, Mechanical Engineering, Civil Engineering and Instrumentation Engineering.

== History ==
It was established in 2018 by the Government of Bihar under the Department of Science and Technology, Bihar.

== Departments ==
The college offers undergraduate courses, Bachelor of Technology in following disciples.

Courses in Bachelor of Technology	Annual intake
Electrical Engineering	60
Mechanical Engineering	60
Civil Engineering	60
Electronics & Instrumentation Engineering	30
Applied Science & Humanities	
Computer Science & Engineering	90
Electronics & Communication Engineering	

== Admission ==
Admission in the college is done by UGEAC conducted by Bihar Combined Entrance Competitive Examination Board.

== College facilities ==
- College Library
- Different clubs for student
- Computer LAB
- Anti-ragging committee
- 24x7 wifi facility
- communication lab
- various specialized labs

== See also ==
- Education in India
- Education in Bihar
- List of educational institutions in Patna
- All India Council for Technical Education
