= Supaul College of Engineering =

Government engineering college in Supaul, Bihar

- सुपौल अभियंत्रण महाविद्यालय
- Type: Government Engineering college
- Established: 2017 (9 years ago)
- Affiliations: Bihar Engineering University
- Principal: Dr. Achyuta Nand Mishra
- Faculty: 65
- Administrative staff: 72
- Students: 800
- Undergraduates: 800
- Location: (India) supaul, Bihar, India
- Campus: Urban
- Acronym: SCE
- Nickname: SCE Supaul
- Website: scesupaul.org

Supaul College of Engineering (सुपौल अभियंत्रण महाविद्यालय) is a government technical institution under Department of Science and Technology, Bihar. The College is affiliated to Bihar Engineering University. It was established in 2017 at Supaul, Bihar.

== Admission ==
From 2022 onwards, admissions will be based on Joint Entrance Examination – Main Or BCECE exam merit list. Students who want to enroll must appear in Joint Entrance Examination – Main or BCECE JEE MAIN Exam that is conducted by National Testing Agency (NTA).

Earlier Undergraduate admissions were done through the Bihar Combined Entrance Competitive Examination(BCECE) conducted by Bihar Combined Entrance Competitive Examination Board, Under Bihar Combined Entrance Competitive Examination Act, 1995 of Bihar government. The Entrance examination was held in two stages: First stage was the screening test or preliminary test. The screened candidates had to appear in the main examination (second stage). Based on the merit list in the second stage, successful candidates were allotted seats in different engineering colleges of Bihar.admission can be done by jee-main

== Courses ==
The institute offers full-time Bachelor of Technology (B.Tech) degree programs in following disciples.

- Civil engineering
- Mechanical engineering
- Electrical engineering
- Electronics and Communication engineering
- Computer Science Engineering
- Computer Science & Artificial Intelligence
