= BP Mandal College of Engineering =

Engineering college in Bihar

- Type: Public
- Established: 2016; 10 years ago
- Affiliations: Bihar Engineering University
- Principal: Prof. Arvind kumar Amar
- Language: English & HindiAnd maithili
- Website: www.bpmcemadhepura.org

BP Mandal College of Engineering, Madhepura is a government engineering college in Madhepura district of Bihar, India. It was established in the year 2016 under Department of Science and Technology, Bihar. The college is named after the name of BP Mandal, 7th chief minister of Bihar. It is affiliated with Bihar Engineering University and approved by All India Council for Technical Education.

== Admission ==
Admission in the college for four years Bachelor of Technology course is made through UGEAC conducted by Bihar Combined Entrance Competitive Examination Board. To apply for UGEAC, appearing in JEE Main of that admission year is required along with other eligibility criteria.

== Departments ==
College have four branches in Bachelor of Technology course with annual intake of 60 students in each branch.

1. Civil Engineering
2. Computer Science & Engineering
3. Electrical & Electronics Engineering
4. Mechanical Engineering
5. Civil Engineering with Computer Application
6. Computer Science & Engineering (Artificial intelligence and Machine Learning)
7. 3D Animation & Graphics
