= Vidyadaan Institute of Technology and Management =

Coordinates: 26.511383°N 80.23493°E

- Type: Education and research institution
- Established: 2010
- Affiliations: Aryabhatta Knowledge University
- President: Surya Kumar Singh
- Undergraduates: 127
- Location: (India) Buxar, Bihar, India
- Campus: 20 acres (8.1 ha)
- Approvals: AICTE
- Nicknames: VITM, Buxar
- Website: www.vidyadaan.org

Vidyadaan Institute of Technology and Management was a college established in 2010 in Buxar, Bihar, India. It was the first engineering college in Bihar affiliated to Aryabhatta Knowledge University. The college was closed in 2021 due to non-payment of loan.

== Academics ==
The college awarded Bachelor of Engineering in several fields of engineering like B.Tech in Information Technology, Computer Science and Engineering, Electronics and Communications Engineering and Electrical and Electronics Engineering.

== See also ==
- List of institutions of higher education in Bihar
- Education in Patna
- Education in Bihar
- Education in India
