= Bihar Engineering University =

State university in Bihar, India

Coordinates: 25.5925°N 85.1350°E

- बिहार अभियंत्रण विश्वविद्यालय
- Official seal of BEU
- Other names: BEU, Patna
- Motto: lokhitāya taknīkī shikṣā sarvadhanam (Sanskrit)
- Motto in English: Technical education for public welfare is the greatest wealth
- Type: Public Technical University
- Established: 9 August 2021; 5 years ago
- Affiliations: UGC; AICTE; AISHE; NPTEL; Government of Bihar
- Chancellor: Nitish Kumar, Samrat Choudhary
- Vice-Chancellor: Prof. Suresh Kant Verma
- Location: Patna, Bihar, India
- Campus: Urban
- Language: English; Hindi
- Website: beu-bih.ac.in

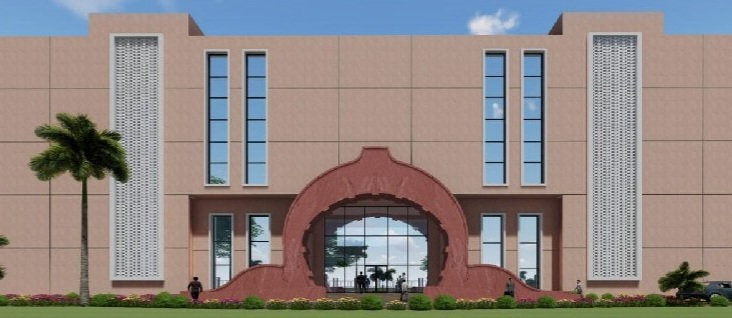
Bihar Engineering University, Patna

Bihar Engineering University (abbreviated as BEU), Patna is a collegiate public state university in Patna, Bihar. It was established by the Government of Bihar w.e.f. 9 August 2021 through The Bihar Engineering University Act 2021 (Bihar Act No. 20 of 2021) to conduct and facilitate affiliation of institutions set up by the Government and/or the Trust or Society or Company in the conventional and new frontiers of Engineering & Technology, Architecture and Planning, Management Programme in teaching, research and extension work. The university aims to ensure uniform academic standards, promote research and innovation, and facilitate quality technical education.

== Administration ==
The Chief Minister of Bihar Mr. Samrat Choudhary is the Chancellor of BEU. The proposal to establish the University was finalized in 2021. In 2022, the government announced that the BEU would start operating from the campus of AKU in Mithapur, Patna. In March 2023, with Department of Science and Technology (Bihar) the government made it mandatory for all the engineering colleges in Bihar to be affiliated to the BEU.

== Affiliated colleges ==
Name	District	Established
Saharsa College of Engineering	Saharsa district	2017
Darbhanga College of Engineering	Darbhanga district	2008
Bhagalpur College of Engineering	Bhagalpur district	1960
Nalanda College of Engineering	Nalanda district	2008
Bakhtiyarpur College of Engineering	Patna district	2016
Gaya College of Engineering	Gaya district	2008
Purnea College of Engineering	Purnia district	2017
Rashtrakavi Ramdhari Singh Dinkar College of Engineering	Begusarai district	2016
Loknayak Jai Prakash Institute of Technology	Saran district	2012
Government Engineering College, Madhubani	Madhubani district	2019
Motihari College of Engineering	East Champaran district	1980
Muzaffarpur Institute of Technology	Muzaffarpur district	1954
Maulana Azad College of Engineering and Technology	Patna	1988
Katihar Engineering College	Katihar district	2016
Shershah College of Engineering	Rohtas district	2016
Supaul College of Engineering	Supaul district	2017
Government Engineering College, Vaishali	Vaishali district	2018
Government Engineering College, Aurangabad	Aurangabad district	2019
Government Engineering College, Jehanabad	Jehanabad district	2019
Government Engineering College, Khagaria	Khagaria district	2019
Government Engineering College, Buxar	Buxar district	2019
Government Engineering College, Sheikhpura	Sheikhpura district	2019
Government Engineering College, Lakhisarai	Lakhisarai district	2019
Government Engineering College, Banka	Banka district	2018
Government Engineering College, Kaimur	Kaimur district	2019
Government Engineering College, Gopalganj	Gopalganj district	2019
Government Engineering College, Munger	Munger district	2019
Government Engineering College, West Champaran	West Champaran district	2019
Government Engineering College, Nawada	Nawada district	2019
Government Engineering College, Samastipur	Samastipur district	2019
Government Engineering College, Jamui	Jamui district	2018
Sitamarhi Institute of Technology	Sitamarhi district	2016
BP Mandal College of Engineering	Madhepura district	2016
Government Engineering College, Bhojpur	Bhojpur district	2018
Government Engineering College, Kishanganj	Kishanganj district	2019
Government Engineering College, Sheohar	Sheohar district	2019
Government Engineering College, Siwan	Siwan district	2018
Shri Phanishwar Nath Renu Engineering College	Araria district	2019
R.P. Sharma Institute of Technology	Patna	1980

== See also ==
- List of institutions of higher education in Bihar
- List of educational institutions in Patna
- List of universities in Bihar
- List of educational institutions in Bihar
- Distance Education Bureau
- Bihar University of Health Sciences
- University Grants Commission (India)
