= Bidheh Law College =

Law college in Bihar

- Type: Law School
- Established: 1977
- Affiliations: UGC; BCI; Bhupendra Narayan Mandal University; Accredited by NAAC
- Location: Madhubani, Bihar, India

Bidheh Law College is a Law school situated in Madhubani in the Indian state of Bihar. It offers undergraduate 3 years LL.B. and 5 years integrated law course which is approved by Bar Council of India (BCI), New Delhi and affiliated to Bhupendra Narayan Mandal University. Bidheh Law College was established in 1977.
