= Achhua =

- Village
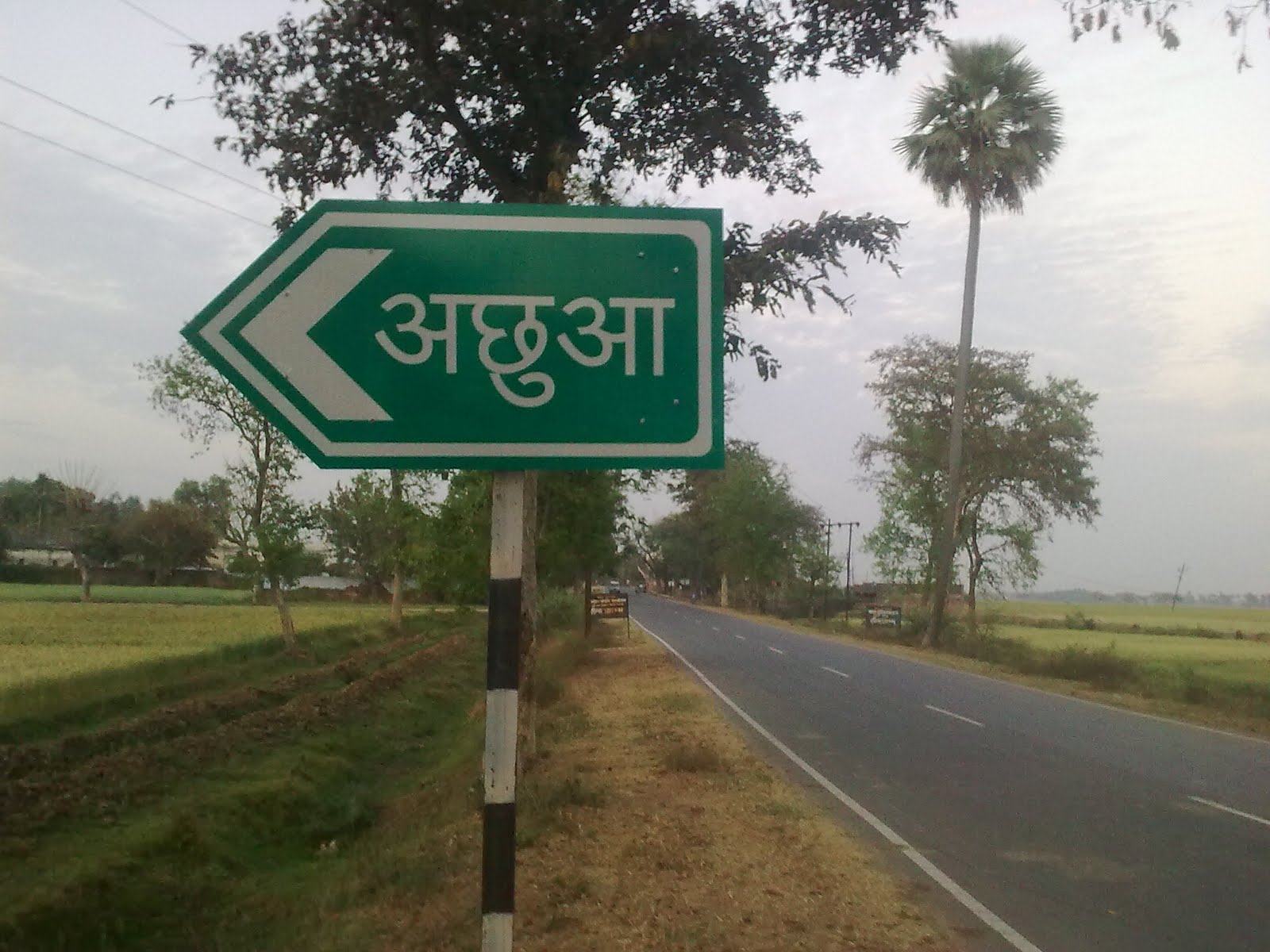

- Location in Bihar, India Achhua (India)
- Coordinates: 25.350852°N 84.817758°E
- Country: India
- State: Bihar
- District: Patna

Population (2001)
  - Total: 2,595

Languages
  - Official: Magahi, Hindi
- Time zone: UTC+5:30 (IST)
- PIN: 801110
- Telephone code: 06135
- ISO 3166 code: IN-BR
- Website: patna.nic.in

Achhua is a village and Gram Panchayat in Patna district in the Indian state of Bihar. It comes under Dulhin Bazar Police Station and Paliganj Vidhan Sabha constituency. Achhua is known for PNK College which provides higher education in this area.

== Geography ==
Achhua is located at 25°21′03″N 84°49′04″E.

Achhua gram panchayat is composed of the following villages:

1. Achhua,
2. Rakasia,
3. Alipur

== Transport ==
Achhua is on SH 2. The State capital, Patna is 45 km to the north.

== Education ==
1. Primary School, Achhua: This is located at center of this village, provides primary education by Government of Bihar.
2. Paras Nath Kushwaha College, Achhua: This is located on the Paliganj - Dulhin Bazaar SH 2 Road. A Degree College under Magadh University provides higher education in this area.

The literacy rate is 62.74% . The female literacy rate is 49.37% . The male literacy rate is 75.63%.

== Economy ==
Agriculture is major source of economy. Paddy, Wheat, Pulse & Vegetables are the major agricultural production. Main sources of irrigation are monsoon and Canal which originate from Sone River.
