= Bihar Combined Entrance Competitive Examination Board =

Examination and admission counselling board in Bihar, India

- बिहार संयुक्त प्रवेश प्रतियोगिता परीक्षा पार्षद
- Abbreviation: BCECEB
- Nickname: BCECE Board
- Formation: 22 July 1995; 31 years ago
- Founded at: Patna
- Type: Governmental organization
- Services: Admission Counselling & Entrance exam
- Official language: Hindi
- Chairman: Member, Board of Revenue, Bihar
- Website: bceceboard.bihar.gov.in

Bihar Combined Entrance Competitive Examination Board (BCECEB) conducts competitive examinations and counsellings every year for admissions in various courses of Medical, Engineering and Agricultural streams in the Institutions of Bihar. It is constituted under Bihar Acts, 1995. Office of the board is situated in IAS Association Building, Patna.

== Admission Counsellings ==
=== UGEAC ===
Under Graduate Engineering Admission Counselling (UGEAC) is conducted for admission to the first year B. Tech. Courses in Government Engineering Colleges of Bihar and Exalt College of Engineering & Technology, Vaishali, Bihar. affiliate under Bihar Engineering University.

Counselling is based on the merit-list (Rank-List) of JEE Main conducted by the National Testing Agency (NTA).

=== UGMAC ===
Under Graduate Medical Admission Counselling (UGMAC) is conducted for admission to the First year of the different Degree (MBBS, BDS, BAMS, BHMS, BUMS, B.V.Sc. & A.H.) courses in Government & Private Medical & Dental Colleges of Bihar state and Bihar Veterinary Colleges. Affiliate under Bihar University of Health science

Counselling is based on the rank list of NEET (UG) conducted by the National Testing Agency.

=== PGEAC ===
Post Graduate Engineering Admission Counselling (PGEAC) is conducted for admission to the first year of the Post Graduate Engineering in following courses: Counselling is based on merit list prepared from the GATE score only.

Course (M. Tech.)	College	Total Seats
Machine Design	Muzaffarpur Institute of Technology	18
Thermal Engineering	Muzaffarpur Institute of Technology	18
Micro Electronics & VLSI Technology	Bhagalpur College of Engineering	30
Power System	Nalanda College of Engineering	30
Power System	Darbhanga College of Engineering	30
Cyber security & VLSI Design Technology	Gaya College of Engineering	18+18

=== PGMAC ===
Post Graduate Medical Admission Counselling (PGMAC) is conducted for admission to first year of Post Graduate Degree & Diploma courses in Government & Private Medical & Dental Colleges of Bihar state.

== Examinations ==
=== BCECE ===
Bihar Combined Entrance Competitive Examination (BCECE) is conducted for the admission in Pharmacy, Medical and Agriculture stream of Institutions recognized by Government of Bihar.

- Pharmacy Stream : Admission in the course B.Pharm.
- Medical Stream : Admission in Graduation courses (Lab. Tech., OT Assistant, X-Ray Tech., Ophthalmic Assistant and Orthotics & Prosthetics) of B. Physiotherapy / B. Occupational Therapy / Para Medical
- Agriculture Stream : Admission in the course B.Sc. (Agriculture) and B.Sc. (Horticulture) of Bihar Agricultural University.

=== BCECE (LE) ===
Bihar Combined Entrance Competitive Examination [Lateral Entry] is conducted to lateral entry in second year of the Undergraduate Engineering, Para Medical and Pharmacy degrees of various government & private Engineering, Para Medical and Pharmacy colleges of Bihar state respectively. It is for the candidates who have passed three years 'Engineering Diploma', two years 'Para Medical' or two years 'Pharmacy Diploma' course.

=== DCECE ===
Diploma Certificate Entrance Competitive Examination (DCECE) is conducted for the admission in the following course groups:

- Polytechnic Engineering Course Group (PE) : Engineering Diploma Courses of government or private Polytechnic institutions under Bihar state.
- Part-Time Four Years Polytechnic Engineering Course Group (PPE): Part-Time Four Years Polytechnic Engineering Diploma Course in New Government Polytechnic, Patna-13 under Bihar state.
- Para Medical (Intermediate Level) Course Group (PM) : Para Medical Course of various government or private Hospitals or Institutions of Bihar state.
- Para Medical-Dental (Secondary Level) Course Group (PMD) : Para Medical-Dental Course of various Hospitals or Institutions of Bihar state.

=== DECE (LE) ===
Diploma Entrance Competitive Examination [Lateral Entry] is conducted for lateral entry to second year of various courses of Engineering Diploma level in various Polytechnic Institutes of Bihar.

=== ITICAT ===
Industrial Training Institute Competitive Admission Test (ITICAT) is conducted for admission in various courses of all government Industrial Training Institutes (ITIs) of Bihar state.

== See also ==
- Joint Entrance Examination – Main
- National Eligibility cum Entrance Test (Undergraduate)
