= Joint Entrance Examination – Main =

Examination for admission to engineering colleges in India

- Acronym: JEE–Main
- Type: Computer Based Test (CBT) and pen and paper Mode (For B. Arch paper only)
- Administrator: National Testing Agency (2019–present)
- Skills tested: Paper 1: Physics, Chemistry, and Mathematics; Paper 2A (for B.Arch only): Mathematics, Aptitude, Drawing; Paper 2B (for B. Planning only): Mathematics, Aptitude, Planning
- Purpose: Admission to undergraduate engineering and architecture courses in 32 NITs, 26 IIITs, 40 GFTIs, statistical data science at ISI Kolkata, State Government and Private Institutes. Also serves as a preliminary selection and eligibility test for appearing JEE-Advanced for admission to IITs
- Year started: 2002 (24 years ago) Formerly known as AIEEE
- Duration: 3 hours
- Score range: -75 to +300 in Paper 1 and -82 to +400 in Paper 2A & 2B
- Offered: Twice a year (Except for the year 2021 where it was conducted 4 times due to the COVID-19 pandemic).
- Restrictions on attempts: Maximum six attempts in three consecutive years as it is conducted twice a year, with no age limit
- Regions: India
- Languages: English; Hindi; Assamese; Bengali; Gujarati; Kannada; Malayalam; Marathi; Odia; Punjabi; Tamil; Telugu; Urdu
- Annual number of test takers: ▲1,538,468 (2026) (B.E./B.Tech); ▲67,139 (2026) (B.Arch); ▲30,050 (2026) (B.Planning)
- Prerequisites: Class 12 or equivalent with Mathematics, Physics and any one of the technical subjects prescribed by AICTE from recognised board/university
- Fee: ₹1,000 (US$10) for General candidates; ₹900 (US$9.30) for General-EWS/OBC-NCL (Central List) candidates; ₹500 (US$5.20) for SC/ST/PwD/Third Gender candidates
- Qualification rate: 16.26% qualify for JEE-Advanced (6.29% through Open seats) (2026)
- Website: jeemain.nta.nic.in As per 2025 information bulletin

The Joint Entrance Examination – Main (JEE–Main), formerly All India Engineering Entrance Examination (AIEEE), is an Indian standardized computer-based test for admission to various technical undergraduate programs in engineering, architecture, and planning across colleges in India. The exam is conducted by the National Testing Agency for admission to B.Tech, B.Arch, B.Planning etc. programs in premier technical institutes such as the National Institutes of Technology (NITs), Indian Institutes of Information Technology (IIITs) and Government Funded Technical Institutes (GFTIs) which are based on the rank secured in the JEE–Main. It is usually conducted twice every year: Session 1 and Session 2 (commonly known as January session and April session). It also serves as a preliminary selection and eligibility test for qualifying JEE (Advanced) for admission to the Indian Institutes of Technology (IITs). Since mid 2019, the JEE has been conducted fully online as a computerized test. Before the NTA, the JEE was administered by the Central Board of Secondary Education.

== History ==
The AIEEE was introduced in 2002, since the newly established NITs, IIITs and GFTIs wanted an entrance examination paper of a higher standard than the Common Engineering Test (CET), which was formerly used for admission to all non-IIT engineering colleges and some state government colleges (by a few states), including RECs and IIITs, owing mostly to the rising competition and the goal of maintaining the exclusiveness of such institutes of national importance.

On 22 November 2010, it was officially announced that the AIEEE 2011 exam would also include an optional computer-based test. In May 2011, when AIEEE 2011 was conducted, it was the first time the exam offered computer-based testing as an option.

On 28 May 2012, the AIEEE was officially renamed JEE–Main, and IIT-JEE was renamed JEE-Advanced; the JEE–Main had become the screening exam for JEE-Advanced; the first test with this change was conducted in 2013.

Until 2018, the exam was held both in pen and paper and CBT modes, as well as was held in the first week of April by the Central Board of Secondary Education (CBSE). It is conducted by National Testing Agency in CBT mode only from 2018 onwards.

The 2020 and 2021 exams were postponed and conducted later in the same years, due to the coronavirus pandemic. 2021 was the only year throughout JEE–Main history, when a maximum of 4 attempts were given to students. In general, for the rest of the years, most students took the JEE–Main exam in either 1 or 2 attempts, even though a maximum of 3 attempts is allowed during two consecutive years.

== Structure ==
The examination consists of only two papers: Paper 1 for B.E./B.Tech courses and Paper 2 for B.Arch and B.Planning courses. A candidate can opt for any or both the papers. Paper 1 is a mandatory computer based test (CBT) (called online mode) from 2018 onwards. Until 2018, there was an option between offline pen and paper mode and online computer mode. The examination was conducted offline pen and paper mode only till 2010. In 2011, as per the orders of the Ministry of Human Resource Development, CBSE conducted Paper 1 in Computer Based Test (CBT) mode for the first one lakh candidates who opted for the same, while the remaining students took the examination in the conventional pen and paper mode. The number of attempts which a candidate can avail at the examination is limited to three in consecutive years. As of 2018, the top 2,24,000 rankers of JEE–Main will qualify to take the second and final level of examination: JEE-Advanced. this number of 2.24 lakh is not fixed this may vary as per difficulty level of paper of JEE–Main.

In 2010, the Ministry of Human Resource Development announced plans to replace JEE with a common entrance test for all government engineering colleges which will be called Indian Science Engineering Eligibility Test (ISEET), by 2013. Accordingly, MHRD proposes to set up National Testing Service, which will be an autonomous and self-sustained agency to conduct this new common entrance test.

The JEE–Main also serves as a preliminary requisite examination for JEE-Advanced.

In 2024, NTA reduced the JEE Main syllabus to reduce pressure and stress among students and to meet the same syllabus structure as that of the revised NCERT books.

In the latest 2025 Information brochure, the syllabus remained same as of 2024 but NTA reduced the number of question in Section - B of Paper - 1 (B.E/B-Tech) from 5 out 10 questions (to be attempted) to 5 out of 5 questions (compulsory) with negative marking.

=== Languages ===
The exam is offered in thirteen languages, namely English, Assamese, Bengali, Gujarati, Hindi, Kannada, Malayalam, Marathi, Odia, Punjabi, Tamil, Telugu, and Urdu.

== Irregularities and Misconduct ==
=== 2011 incident ===
In 2011, CBSE postponed the exam by a few hours after the questions were leaked in Lucknow, Utter pradesh the night before. CBSE sent alternative questions to exam centres. CBSE announced the postponement of the exam 60 minutes before the scheduled start of the examination.

=== JEE (Main) 2020 Assam topper scam ===
In 2020, Neel Nakshatra Das, a candidate for JEE–Main, used a substitute to give the exam. He subsequently scored 99.8 percentile in the exam and topped in his state, Assam. Seven people were arrested, including Bhargav Deka, the owner of a city-based coaching institute, Global Edu Light, Tata Consultancy Services employees, the candidate (Neel Nakshatra Das), Neel's father, Jyotirmoy Das, and an invigilator.

=== JEE (Main) 2022 technical glitches ===
National Testing Agency (NTA) was widely criticized for the improper conduction of the JEE–Main 2022 examination. Many students faced technical glitches during the examination, which resulted in lower scores. Glitches in answer key and response sheet of the exam were also a serious problem for the students. The agency did not consider re-conduction of the examination.

=== Apparent Misconduct and Irregularity in JEE (Main) 2024 ===
NTA has been criticized for irregularities in the difficulty level of question papers of JEE(Main), which leads to the normalization of marks and ultimately, lower scores of candidates.

==== JEE(Main) 2024 Session 1 (January) ====
The discrepancy of appearing students in the initial four shifts of January 27(Shift 1 and 2) and January 29(Shift 1 and 2) has been reported by many students. The NTA allegedly distributed candidates erratically over the 10 shifts. Claims state that an absurdly larger appearance of students on the first two days was observed which caused major disparities in percentiles of the candidates. A surge in cutoff was also observed which further caused despair among some students. Multiple requests under the RTI Act have been filed, seeking evidence-backed statistical records of the number of students appearing in the respective shifts. However, NTA released data in which no uneven distribution of candidates was found.

==== JEE(Main) 2024 Session 2 (April) ====
The agency stated that one case of impersonation and nine cases of cheating or other unfair means were reported on 4 April. It was later reported that the impersonation case was reported in Noida, while the other nine cases were reported in various parts of the country. The offenders were detected through artificial intelligence enabled monitoring and biometric verification. In its concluding press release, the agency highlighted that 39 candidates have been disqualified for a period of three years due to their involvement in unfair practices during the examination.

=== JEE(Main) 2025 Session 2 (April) Irregularities in the Final Results ===
Following the release of the JEE Main 2025 Session 2 results by the National Testing Agency (NTA), concerns were raised by students and educators regarding discrepancies in the NTA percentile scores. Several students reported a mismatch between their raw scores and the percentiles allotted, with instances where candidates with lower scores received higher percentiles, while those with higher raw scores were awarded comparatively lower percentiles.

This anomaly sparked confusion and dissatisfaction, particularly among students who narrowly missed the eligibility cutoff for JEE Advanced 2025 due to their reported percentiles. Many candidates took to social media platforms to share their experiences, and the issue gained wider attention after it was first highlighted by a YouTuber in his video and in the comments section, who analyzed and compared scorecards submitted by affected students.

As the issue gained traction, demands for clarification from the NTA increased, with some students urging a review or reevaluation of the percentile normalization process used for multi-shift exams. At the time, the NTA had not issued a formal statement addressing the specific mismatches reported in Session 2.

== Mode of Exam ==
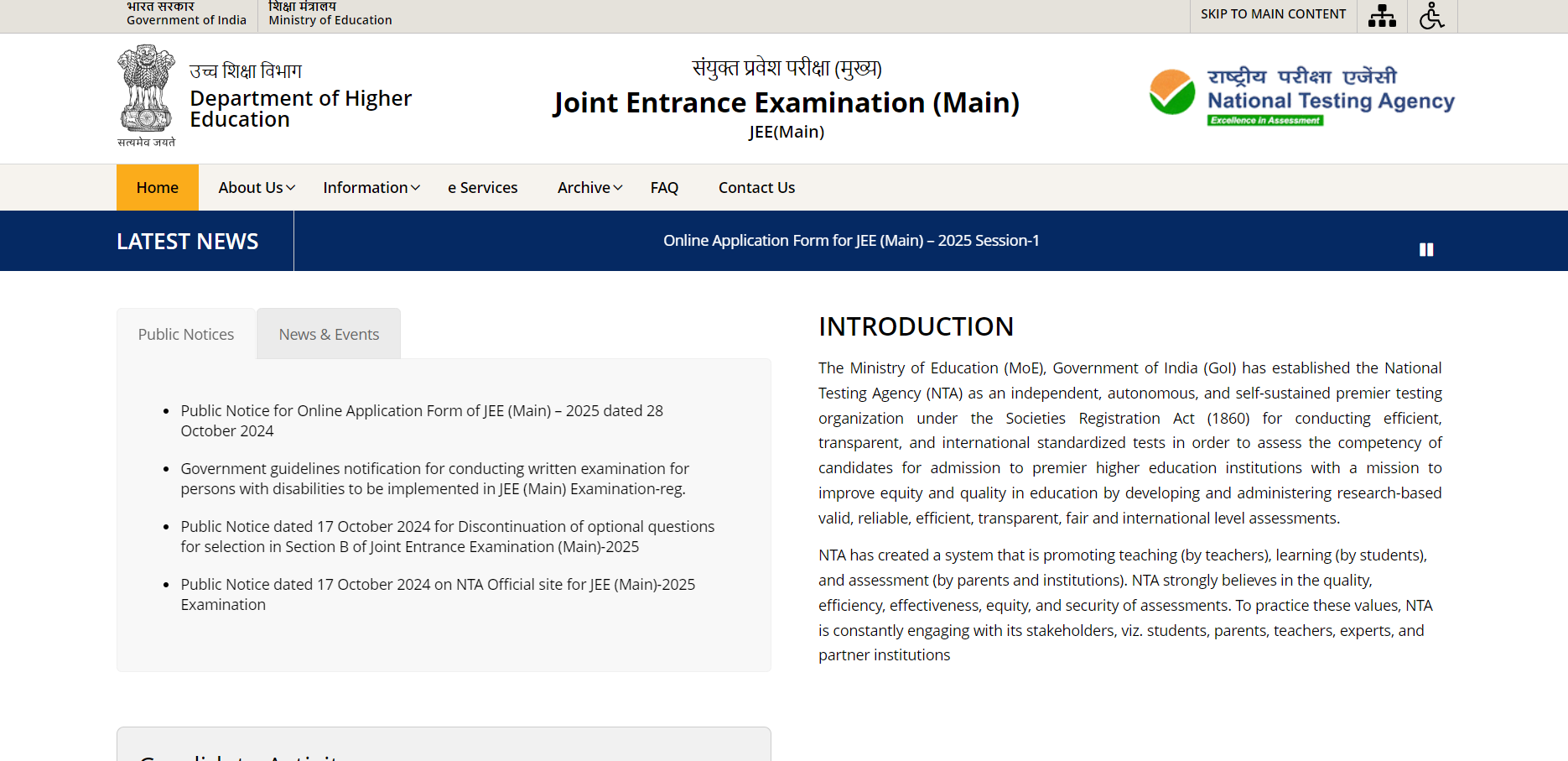
Official website of NTA JEE Main 2026

- B.E./B.Tech (Paper 1): Physics, Chemistry, and Mathematics
- B.Arch (Paper 2A): Mathematics, Aptitude, and Drawing
- B.Planning (Paper 2B): Mathematics, Aptitude, and Planning

== Participating institutes ==
Institutes participating in the 2022 centralized seat allocation process included:

- The 32 National Institutes of Technology (NITs).
- The 26 Indian Institutes of Information Technology (IIITs).
- 40 Government Funded Technical Institutes (GFTIs).
- The Indian Statistical Institute uses math percentile for admissions to Bachelor of Statistical Data Science.
- Indirectly, the 23 Indian Institutes of Technology (IITs).
- Indirectly, Indian Institute of Space Technology (IIST) and Indian Maritime University (IMU).
- State institutes.
- Several self-financed institutes (during the spot round).
- Many private Deemed universities use JEE (Main) rank for admissions through their own seat allocation processes.

== Number of applicants by year ==
The number of applicants taking the JEE–Main has varied over the years, with a peak of over 1.35 million in 2014.

=== B.E./B.Tech ===
Year	Phase	No. of registered applicants	No. of appeared applicants	No. of unique registered applicants	No. of unique appeared applicants	Reference(s)
2002	Once a year	211,696	190,045	N/A		
2003	Once a year	327,721	298,490	N/A		
2004	Once a year	417,723	357,266	N/A		
2005	Once a year	436,048	398,735	N/A		
2006	Once a year	523,811	492,683	N/A		
2007	Once a year	644,758	602,309	N/A		
2008	Once a year	862,515	790,852	N/A		
2009	Once a year	1,010,061	962,119	N/A		
2010	Once a year	1,118,147	1,065,100	N/A		
2011	Once a year	1,114,880	1,053,833	N/A		
2012	Once a year	1,145,353	1,070,276	N/A		
2013	Once a year	1,282,000		N/A		
2014	Once a year	1,356,805		N/A		
2015	Once a year	1,304,495		N/A		
2016	Once a year	1,194,934	1,128,633	N/A		
2017	Once a year	1,186,454	1,122,351	N/A		
2018	Once a year	1,259,000	1,043,000	N/A		
2019	1	929,198	874,469	1,237,892	1,147,125	
2019	2	935,741	881,096	1,237,892	1,147,125	
2020	1	921,000	869,000	1,174,000	1,023,000	
2020	2	841,000	635,000	1,174,000	1,023,000	
2021	1	652,628	621,033	1,048,012	939,008	
2021	2	619,641	556,248	1,048,012	939,008	
2021	3	709,611	543,553	1,048,012	939,008	
2021	4	767,700	481,419	1,048,012	939,008	
2022	1	872,970	769,604	1,026,799	905,590	
2022	2	622,034	540,242	1,026,799	905,590	
2023	1	860,064	823,967	1,162,398	1,113,325	
2023	2	931,510	883,372	1,162,398	1,113,325	
2024	1	1,221,624	1,170,048	1,476,557	1,415,110	
2024	2	1,179,569	1,067,959	1,476,557	1,415,110	
2025	1	1,311,544	1,258,136	1,539,848	1,475,103	
2025	2	1,061,840	992,350	1,539,848	1,475,103	
2026	1	1,355,293	1,304,653	1,604,854	1,538,468	
2026	2	1,110,904	1,034,330	1,604,854	1,538,468	

=== B.Arch ===
(From 2021)

Year	Phase	No. of registered applicants	No. of appeared applicants	No. of unique registered applicants	No. of unique appeared applicants	Reference(s)
2021	1	59,962	48,836	91,468	62,035▼	
2021	2	74,479	29,004	91,468	62,035▼	
2022	1	61,534	39,639	77,849	46,336▼	
2022	2	32,724	14,924	77,849	46,336▼	
2023	1					
2023	2					
2024	1	68,147	51,570	99,086 (B.Arch+B.Planning)	71,009 (B.Arch+B.Planning)	
2024	2	73,362	36,707	99,086 (B.Arch+B.Planning)	71,009 (B.Arch+B.Planning)	
2025	1	63,481	44,144	91,378	63,378	
2025	2	48,703	34,876	91,378	63,378	
2026	1	64,786	45,452	94,513	67,139	
2026	2	51,729	38,914	94,513	67,139	

=== B.Planning ===
(From 2021)

Year	Phase	No. of registered applicants	No. of appeared applicants	No. of unique registered applicants	No. of unique appeared applicants	Reference(s)
2021	1	25,810	19,352	40,346	24,351▼	
2021	2	32,108	10,551	40,346	24,351▼	
2022	1	25,820	15,371	33,048	17,817▼	
2022	2	12,758	4,912	33,048	17,817▼	
2023	1					
2023	2					
2024	1	36,672	24,876	99,086 (B.Arch+B.Planning)	71,009 (B.Arch+B.Planning)	
2024	2	38,105	16,228	99,086 (B.Arch+B.Planning)	71,009 (B.Arch+B.Planning)	
2025	1	28,335	18,596	41,012	26,590	
2025	2	20,768	13,583	41,012	26,590	
2026	1	32,366	21,067	45,729	30,050	
2026	2	22,051	15,654	45,729	30,050	

=== Common Paper (B.Arch/B.Planning) ===
(Before 2021)

Year	Phase	No. of registered applicants	No. of appeared applicants	No. of unique registered applicants	No. of unique appeared applicants	Reference(s)
2019	1	180,052	145,386	275,913	227,907	
2019	2	169,759	144,032	275,913	227,907	
2020	1	145,189	118,732	207,369	147,983▼	
2020	2	112,139	76,889	207,369	147,983▼	

== Counselling ==
Earlier, counselling for the JEE–Main was conducted through the CSAB; but, now, the authorities have made changes in the counselling procedure. The JAB (Joint Admission Board), representing IITs, and the CSAB (Central Seat Allocation Board), making agreements on behalf of the NITs (National Institutes of Technology) and other CFTIs (Centrally Funded Technical Institutes), are now united to conduct counselling (common counselling) for the two exams of the IIT-JEE. The memo for the same was signed on 2 May 2015. These two together are known as the Joint Seat Allocation Authority (JoSAA). The ministry of education constituted Joint Seat Allocation Authority (JoSAA) consisting of the Central Seat Allocation Board (CSAB) and the Joint Admission Board of IITs (JAB-IITs) for joint counselling and seat allocation to IITs and the NIT+ system, which consists of 31 NITs, IIEST Shibpur, 26 IIITs, three Schools of Planning and Architecture (SPAs) and 37 GFTIs (Central/State Government Funded Technical Institutions).

== See also ==
- National Institutes of Technology (NITs)
- Indian Institutes of Technology (IITs)
- Government Funded Technical Institutes (GFTIs)
- Indian Institutes of Information Technology (IIITs)
- All India Council for Technical Education
- Joint Entrance Examination – Advanced (IIT-JEE/ JEE Advanced)
- National Eligibility cum Entrance Test (Undergraduate) (NEET-UG)
- Joint Seat Allocation Authority (JoSAA)
- List of Engineering Entrance Exams in India
- List of Public service commissions in India
