= Department of Science and Technology (Bihar) =

Department of Government of Bihar

Department of Science, Technology and Technical Education, Bihar
- विज्ञान प्रावैधिकी एवं तकनीकी शिक्षा विभाग, बिहार

Department overview
- Formed: 1973 (53 years ago)
- Jurisdiction: Government of Bihar
- Headquarters: Patna, Bihar, India; 25°36′22″N 85°06′54″E
- Minister responsible: Vijay Kumar Chaudhary
- Child Department: Department of Information Technology, Bihar
- Website: state.bihar.gov.in/dst/

The Department of Science, Technology and Technical Education is a department of Government of Bihar. It is the administrative body for all technical institutions established by Government of Bihar. The department is responsible for the development and policy decision in the field of science and technology. It regulates scientific and technical education in colleges and universities of Bihar. DST was established a Bihar Engineering University in 2021.Bihar Engineering University (BEU), Patna has been established by the Government of Bihar vide Bihar Engineering University, ACT, 2021 (Act No. 20 of 2021), published in the Bihar Gazette No.-677 date 09/08/2021.Chief minister of Bihar is the chancellor of Bihar Engineering University.

The Department of Science, Technology, and Technical Education (DSTTE), Bihar, maintains an active presence on various social media platforms to engage with the audience, disseminate information, and promote educational initiatives. The official social media handles of the department are regularly updated with news, events, policies, and opportunities related to science, technology, and technical education in the state. You can follow the Department on Facebook, Twitter, Instagram, YouTube and LinkedIn. Through these platforms, the department aims to foster a vibrant community of learners, educators, and innovators, while encouraging public participation in the development and implementation of its programmes. Additionally, the department seeks to promote the exchange of science and technology knowledge, empowering the community to actively contribute to advancements in these fields.

== History ==
The department was originally called Industry and Technical Education Department and was controlled by Department of Industry, Bihar. It became an independent department in 1973. In 2007, the Department of Information Technology was split from the Department of Science and Technology to become an independent department.
