= List of educational institutions in Patna =

Educational institutions in Patna, India, listed below, include universities and colleges, as well as institutions specialising in engineering and polytechnic education, management and information technology, medicine and dentistry, and design and fashion.

== Institutes of National Importance ==
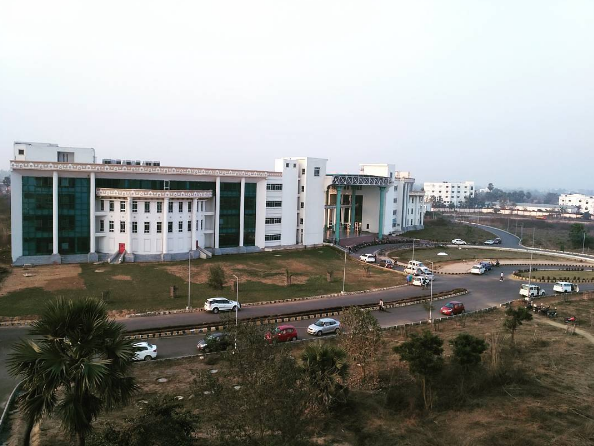
IIT Patna

S.No	University	Location	Type	Established	Specialization	Source
1	All India Institute of Medical Sciences, Patna	Patna	Autonomous	2012	Medical	
2	Indian Institute of Technology Patna	Patna	Autonomous	2008	Science and Technology	
3	National Institute of Technology, Patna	Patna	Autonomous	1886 (1924) (2004)	Science and Technology	

== Universities ==
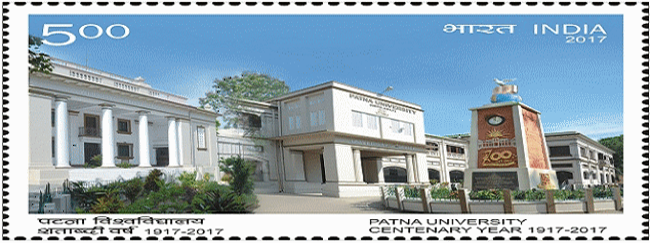
Patna University depicted on a 2017 stamp.

- Amity University, Patna
- Aryabhatta Knowledge University
- Bihar Animal Sciences University
- Bihar Engineering University
- Bihar University of Health Sciences
- Chanakya National Law University
- Maulana Mazharul Haque Arabic and Persian University
- Nalanda Open University
- Patliputra University
- Patna University
- Tilka Manjhi Bhagalpur University, Bhagalpur
- Lalit Narayan Mithila University, Darbhanga
- Munger University, Munger
- Purnea University, Purnea
- Babasaheb Bhimrao Ambedkar Bihar University

== Engineering institutions ==
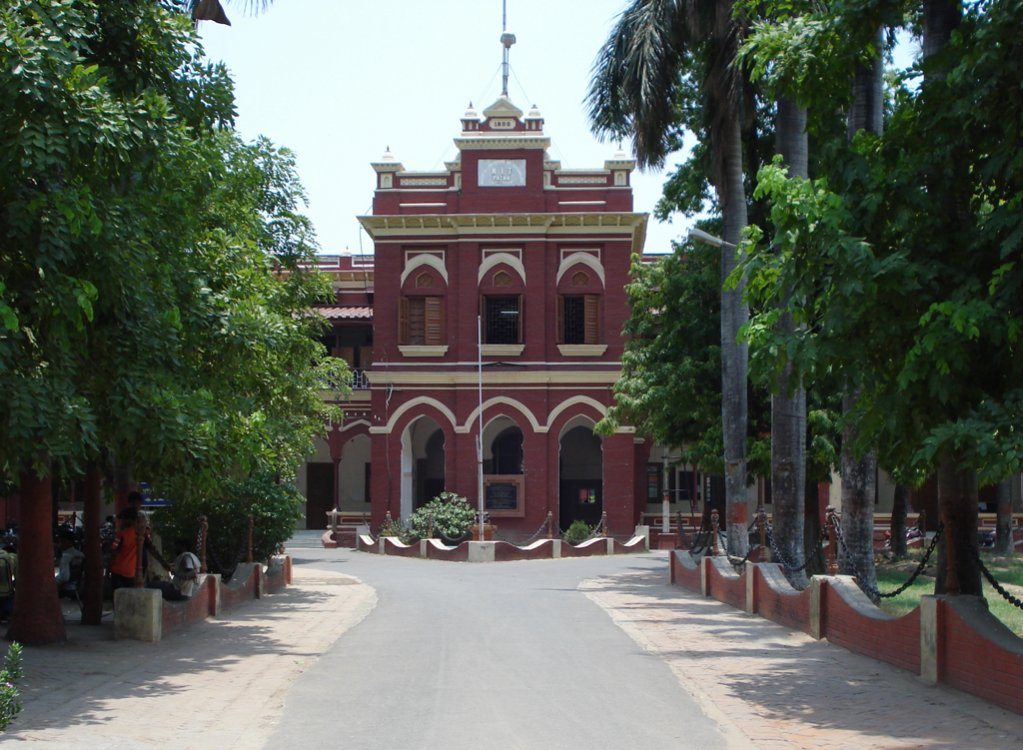
Main Building of NIT Patna

- Bakhtiyarpur College of Engineering
- Birla Institute of Technology, Patna
- Indian Institute of Technology, Patna
- Maulana Azad College of Engineering and Technology
- National Institute of Technology, Patna
- Netaji Subhas Institute of Technology, Bihta
- R.P. Sharma Institute of Technology

== Government polytechnics ==
- Government Polytechnic, Patna-7
- Government Polytechnic, Patna-13

== Management/IT ==
- Amity Global Business School
- Catalyst Institute of Management and Advance Global Excellence (CIMAGE)
- Chandragupt Institute of Management
- Cybotech Campus
- Department of FMS, National Institute of Fashion Technology, Patna
- Development Management Institute
- International School of Management Patna
- Lalit Narayan Mishra Institute of Economic Development and Social Change
- St. Xavier's College of Management and Technology

== Medical Science ==
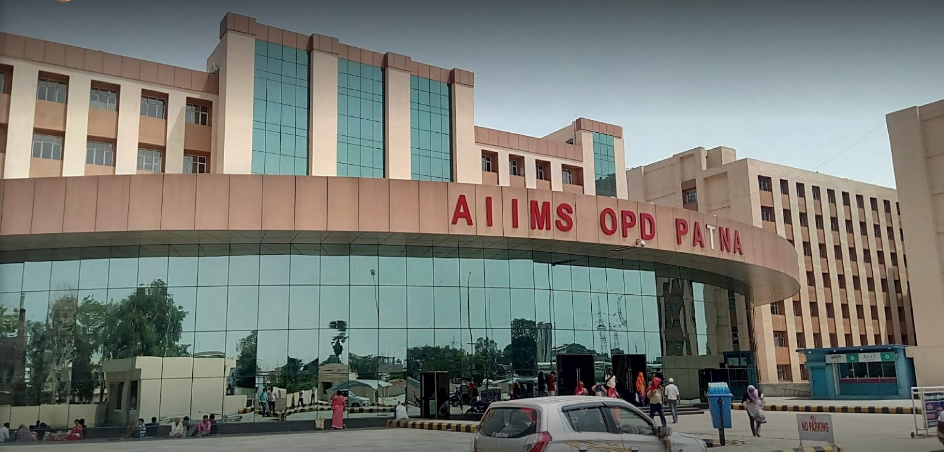
AIIMS Patna OPD

- All India Institute of Medical Sciences, Patna
- Government Ayurvedic College, Patna
- Government Tibbi College and Hospital, Patna
- Indira Gandhi Institute of Medical Sciences
- Nalanda Medical College and Hospital
- National Institute of Health Education & Research
- Patna Medical College and Hospital (earlier Prince of Wales Medical College)
- Rajendra Memorial Research Institute of Medical Sciences (under ICMR)

== Dental Science ==
- Patna Dental College

== General ==
- Anugrah Narayan College, Patna
- Bihar National College
- Magadh Mahila College
- Paras Nath Kushwaha College
- Patna College
- Patna Women's College
- St. Xavier's College, Patna
- Vanijya Mahavidyala

== Design/Fashion ==
- College of Arts and Crafts, Patna
- National Institute of Fashion Technology Patna

== Others ==
- Asian Development Research Institute
- Bihar Institute of Law
- Bihar Urdu Academy
- British Lingua
- Oriental College, Patna City
- Patna Law College
- Patna Training College
- Patna Women's Training College
- Sri Guru Gobind Singh College, Patna
- St. Xavier's College of Education

== See also ==
- List of educational institutions in Bihar
- Education in Bihar
- Institutes of National Importance
