= Education in Bihar =

Education in area of India

Bihar has historically been an important centre of education and is home to some of India's oldest universities. Historical records indicate that Bihar's educational institutions were significantly disrupted during the medieval period following military conquests of the region. In recent history, the education system in Bihar has undergone significant changes, with efforts focused on improving access, overall quality, and educational infrastructure.

Bihar's education system expanded during the late colonial period of British rule, when a university was established in Patna, along with other centers of higher education, namely the Patna Science College, Prince of Wales Medical College (now the Patna Medical College and Hospital), and the National Institute of Technology, Patna. This early lead was lost in the post-independence period, when Bihar's politicians lost out in the race to get institutes of education established in the state. National institutes of learning, such as IIT, IIM, AIIMS, IISER, and NISER, had a notable representation from Bihar. A survey by Pratham rated these institutes' teachings to have been better absorbed by children in Bihar than those in other states. According to the government, the out-of-school rate in the 6–14 age group was 6.3% in 2007, a significant drop from the 12.8% rate in 2006.

The landscape of education in Bihar has evolved significantly over time. In the late colonial period, the region witnessed a revival of learning with the establishment of several institutions of higher education in Patna. In recent years, reforms introduced by the Bihar School Examination Board (BSEB)—including interviews for top-ranking students and revised examination formats—have coincided with a rise in official pass rates. A key change has been the introduction of a 50% objective component consisting of Multiple Choice Questions (MCQs). Under this system, theory-based subjects include 50 MCQs, while subjects with a practical component include 35 MCQs. As a result, the 2020 examination results showed a notable improvement, with pass rates increasing to 80.44% for Class 12 and 80.59% for Class 10. However, the state faced challenges in securing placements for its students in national institutes after independence for several decades.

== History of education ==
Historically, Bihar has been home to the ancient Universities of Nalanda (est. 450 CE), Odantapura (est. 550 CE), and Vikramashila (est. 783 CE). The Nalanda and Vikramshila universities were destroyed during the military campaigns of Bakhtiyar Khilji in c. 1200 CE.

Bihar saw a revival of its education system during the latter part of British rule, when Patna University, the seventh-oldest university of the Indian subcontinent, was established in 1917. Some other institutions established during British rule include Patna College (est. 1839), Bihar School of Engineering (est. 1900; now known as National Institute of Technology, Patna), Prince of Wales Medical College (est. 1925; now Patna Medical College and Hospital), Science College, Patna (est. 1928), Patna Women's College, Bihar Veterinary College (est. 1927), and Imperial Agriculture Research Institute (est. 1905; now Dr. Rajendra Prasad Central Agriculture University, Pusa).

The second-oldest engineering college in India was established as a survey training school in 1886 and later renamed Bihar College of Engineering in 1932. Subsequently, the Indian government upgraded the Bihar College of Engineering to National Institute of Technology (NIT) status in 2004 and granted it Institute of National Importance status in 2007, in accordance with the National Institutes of Technology Act, 2007.

Bihar was an important educational centre in Eastern India before independence. In the 1960s, major educational reforms were implemented to streamline the education structure of the state by the then education minister and educationist Satyendra Narayan Sinha. In 1962, Magadh University was established in Bodh Gaya. In 1963, the Bihar School of Yoga was established in Munger.

Bihar has an underdeveloped educational infrastructure, creating a gap between educational demand and available infrastructure. Educational infrastructure challenges were exacerbated by rapid population growth and administrative issues during the late 20th century. Following changes in state leadership in 2005, there has been a renewed focus on infrastructure investment and literacy programs. Improved governance has led to an economic revival in the state through increased investment in infrastructure, better health care facilities, greater emphasis on education, and a reduction in crime and corruption. High demand for higher education among the general population of Bihar has led to a migration of the student community from the state. This has led to large scale student migration for those seeking educational opportunities in other states, such as New Delhi and Karnataka, especially for graduate-level college education. A study found that 37.8% of Bihar's teachers were absent during unannounced visits to schools, the worst teacher absence rate in India and one of the worst in the world. Despite challenges in educational investment in Bihar, some studies have reported comparatively strong student performance relative to other economically disadvantaged states.

== Ancient period ==
The most significant contributions to education in ancient Bihar came from the Gupta and Pala dynasties, which patronized prominent Buddhist universities. In the 5th century CE, Kumaragupta I, a Gupta emperor, established Nalanda University, making it one of the world's earliest residential universities. Later, the Pala dynasty, known for its patronage of Nalanda, established other significant centers of learning in the region, including Vikramashila University in the 8th century CE.

== Modern period ==
In the modern era, key figures and governing bodies have significantly shaped the educational landscape of Bihar. The British East India Company established Patna Collegiate School in 1835 to introduce English-style education to the region. Acharya Badrinath Verma, the first Education Minister of Bihar after India's independence, laid the foundation for the modern education system. The state government of Bihar has implemented several reform initiatives, including the Bihar Education Project and the establishment of the Bihar School Examination Board in 1952. As Chief Minister, Nitish Kumar oversaw the creation of the Simultala Awasiya Vidyalaya in 2010, a state-run school renowned for its high-achieving students. In 2010, the Government of India revived Nalanda University as an international center of learning, preserving its rich legacy for the modern era.

== Literacy ==
Literacy rate from 1951 to 2011
| Year | Total | Males | Females |
|---|---|---|---|
| 1961 | 21.95 | 35.85 | 8.11 |
| 1971 | 23.17 | 35.86 | 9.86 |
| 1981 | 32.32 | 47.11 | 16.61 |
| 1991 | 37.49 | 51.37 | 21.99 |
| 2001 | 47.53 | 60.32 | 33.57 |
| 2011 | 63.82 | 73.39 | 53.33 |
| 2017 | 70.9 | 79.7 | 60.5 |

Bihar has a total literacy rate of 70.9% in 2017. The number of literate people in Bihar is 31,675,607, which includes 20,978,955 men and 10,696,652 women. The overall literacy rates are 79.7% and 60.5%, respectively. The total rural literacy rate is 69.5%, where the male and female literacy rates are 78.6% and 58.7% respectively. The total urban literacy rate is 83.1%, where the male and female literacy rates are 89.3% and 75.9% respectively. The Patna district has the highest literacy rate in Bihar (87.82%), followed by Rohtas (80.36%) and Munger (78.11%). Kishanganj has the lowest literacy rate in Bihar (61.05%), followed by Araria (64.95%) and Katihar (65.46%). A recent survey by Pratham rated the receptivity of Bihari children to their teaching as being better than those in other Indian states. Authorities in Bihar have taken measures to improve female literacy, which currently stands at 60.5%. Soon after India proclaimed its independence, female literacy rates in Bihar was recorded at 4.22%, according to the 1951 Census.

== Primary and secondary education ==
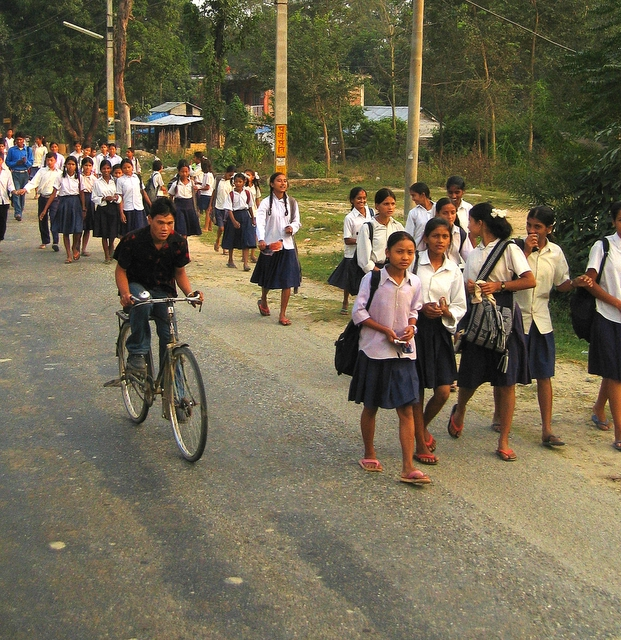

Since the British colonial period in India, Bihar has had a system of district schools, called Zila schools, located in the older districts of Bihar. In addition, there were private and semi-aided schools which were run and administered by local village communities. Several were known for offering higher-quality education.

During the late 1970s and early 1980s, the state government took over management of most privately run schools. This adversely affected education in the state, as the state government was ill-equipped to manage the schools through its bureaucrats, who were trained for law and order duties. Though the state accorded the schools government recognition, the standard started to fall. The state did not take over the schools run by the Christian missionaries, and these schools continued operating independently and are often associated with higher educational outcomes.

As in other states, the central government runs several Kendriya Vidyalayas (Central Schools) and Jawahar Navodaya Vidyalayas for rural students. Jawahar Navodaya Vidyalayas, started by the late Prime Minister Rajiv Gandhi, have been successful in providing quality education to the weaker sections of society.

Simultala Awasiya Vidyalaya was established in 2010 during the tenure of Chief Minister Nitish Kumar. The school has consistently recorded strong performances in the Bihar School Examination Board.

The number of private schools, including school-chains and missionary schools run by Christian missionaries, as well as madrasas and schools run by Muslim clerics, has increased in the post-liberalisation era.

Most of the schools in Bihar are affiliated with the Bihar School Examination Board, while the Kendriya Vidyalaya and a few other elite schools, including the Christian missionary schools, are affiliated with the CBSE board. A recent survey by National University of Educational Planning & Administration (NUEPA) has determined that only 21% of all primary school teachers in Bihar have completed the matriculation or 10th standard. However, the Bihar Government has recently implemented a series of reforms in its primary education sector, which includes mandatory digitisation of all state-run schools.

At the primary level, government schools are often the only option available to poor families, especially in rural areas. However, many of these schools suffer from inadequate infrastructure, including poorly maintained buildings, a lack of basic teaching materials, and shortages of teachers. A large proportion of teachers come from socially and economically dominant groups, and their attitudes can discourage students from lower castes and classes from attending school. Although teachers from Other Backward Classes (OBCs) were appointed in the 1990s, irregular payment of salaries has affected their regular attendance. In addition, poor road connectivity and limited transport facilities further reduce school participation.

== Higher education ==
Bihar is home to Institutes of National Importance, including IIT Patna, IIM Bodh Gaya, AIIMS, Patna, NIT Patna, IIIT Bhagalpur, NIPER Hajipur, Dr. Rajendra Prasad Central Agriculture University, and Nalanda University.

In 2008, Indian Institutes of Technology Patna was inaugurated and the National Institute of Fashion Technology, Patna was established. The Indian Institute of Management Bodh Gaya was established in 2015. In March 2019, the government of Bihar sent a proposal to the central government to upgrade Darbhanga Medical College and Hospital into an AIIMS-like institution.

Bihar is home to four central universities: Central University of South Bihar, Mahatma Gandhi Central University, Dr. Rajendra Prasad Central Agriculture University, and Nalanda University. In 2015, the central government had proposed the re-establishment of Vikramshila in Bhagalpur and had designated ₹500 crore (₹5 billion) for it. Bihar also has institutes such as National Law University, Patna; Institute of Hotel Management (IHM); Footwear Design and Development Institute, Bihta; and Central Institute of Petrochemicals Engineering & Technology (CIPET). CIPET and IHM were established in Hajipur in 1994 and 1998 respectively. In 2021, the government of Bihar established Bihar Engineering University specially for engineering and the Bihar University of Health Sciences for the medical field.

Aryabhatta Knowledge University was established under the Aryabhatta Knowledge University Act, 2008 with the purpose of the development and management of educational infrastructure, management, and allied professional education within the state. Birla Institute of Technology, Patna was established in 2006. In 2008, Indian Institutes of Technology, Patna was inaugurated with students from all over India. In 2008, NSIT opened its new college in Bihta, which is now emerging as an education hub. Chanakya National Law University and Chandragupt Institute of Management were established in the later half of 2008 and now attract students from across India. Nalanda International University was established in 2014, with active investment from countries such as Japan, Korea, and China. The A.N. Sinha Institute of Social Studies is a premier research institute in the state.

Bihar has eight medical colleges which are funded by the government, namely Patna Medical College and Hospital; Nalanda Medical College and Hospital; Vardhman Institute of Medical Sciences; Indira Gandhi Institute of Medical Sciences; Darbhanga Medical College and Hospital; Anugrah Narayan Magadh Medical College and Hospital; Sri Krishna Medical College and Hospital; Jawaharlal Nehru Medical College, Bhagalpur; Government Medical College, Bettiah; and five private medical colleges. In 2014, the government of Bihar established the Development Management Institute in Bihta, near Patna. In February 2019, deputy chief minister Sushil Modi announced the Bihar government's plan to establish 11 new medical colleges at Chhapra, Purnia, Samastipur, Begusarai, Sitamarhi, Vaishali, Jhanjharpur, Siwan, Buxar, Bhojpur, and Jamui, as well as a dental college at Rahui in the Nalanda district under construction. There were also plans for constructing a cancer institute within the Indira Gandhi Institute of Medical Sciences premises and the transformation of Patna Medical College and Hospital into a world-class health centre.

The Bihar government runs several state-level general-purpose universities such as Bhupendra Narayan Mandal University, B. R. Ambedkar Bihar University, Jai Prakash University, Lalit Narayan Mithila University, Magadh University, Patna University, Tilka Manjhi Bhagalpur University, Veer Kunwar Singh University, Patliputra University, Purnea University, and Munger University. Nalanda Open University was established in March 1987 by the government of Bihar to impart education exclusively through distance education. Later, in 1995, the Nalanda Open University Act was passed by the legislature of Bihar and thereafter came under the authority and jurisdiction of the act. Bihar has the specialized universities Bihar Agricultural University and Bihar Animal Sciences University to promote use of technology in agriculture and animal husbandry. Bihar Animal Sciences University has three constituent colleges: Bihar Veterinary College; Sanjay Gandhi Institute of Dairy Technology (Patna); and College of Fisheries, Kishanganj. Bihar has two language-specific universities: Arabic and Persian University and Darbhanga Sanskrit University.

With institutes like Super 30, Patna has emerged as a major centre for engineering and civil services coaching. The major private IIT-JEE coaching institutes have opened up branches in Bihar, and this has reduced the number of students who go to other states for engineering or medical coaching.

== Employability ==
Bihar e-Governance Services & Technologies (BeST) and the government of Bihar have initiated a unique program to establish a center of excellence called Bihar Knowledge Center, a finishing school to equip students with the latest skills and customised short-term training programs at an affordable cost. The center aims to attract the youth of the state to improve their technical, professional, and soft skills to meet the current requirements of the industrial job market. The National Employability Report of Engineering Graduates, 2014, puts graduates from Bihar in the top 25 percent of the country and rates Bihar as one of the top three states at producing engineering graduates in terms of quality and employability.

== Educational challenges ==
In Bihar, one of the most populous states of India, women's education represents a complex relationship between major advancements and setbacks. The state's historical and current socioeconomic inequality greatly influences its struggling educational system, which lags behind all other states in India. The state is largely dependent on agriculture, which dwindles socioeconomic opportunities for its residents. Recently, women's education has improved as a result of government and grassroot initiatives. However, the educational landscape in Bihar still faces major challenges including infrastructure disparities, socioeconomic limitations, cultural expectations, and the influence of societal standards.

The region's history of exploitation contributes heavily to the current suffering state of the educational system. During the British Raj, the colonial government and the local zamindars jointly focused on collecting taxes, which overshadowed the critical need for educational opportunities to allow for economic and social development. After independence from Britain, the trend of educational neglect continued, although with elected government officials in charge. The choice to place revenue collection at the utmost importance ahead of comprehensive development greatly hindered access to quality education for socioeconomic opportunities. Bihar is the second poorest state in all of India.

In Bihar, around 80% of the population relies on agricultural production, and over 40% of the population is considered to be below the poverty line. The state has poor levels of educational attainment and a high rate of illiteracy. Access to education is a major factor in the region's poverty. High rates of unemployment are prevalent due to the population possessing a limited skillset as a result of an inadequate education system. The poverty cycle is further perpetuated by large amounts of the population not meeting the educational requirements for higher-paying jobs.

Due to the region's historical neglect, poor infrastructure development, and economic constraints that contribute to high dropout rates, Bihar has historically low literacy rates. Despite an improvement in literacy from around 47% in 2001 to approximately 63% in 2011, the state continues to record one of the lowest literacy rates in India, standing at 74.3% as per the MoSPI PLFS 2023–24, second only to Andhra Pradesh. The low literacy rate emphasizes the necessity for improvements in the education system and socioeconomic issues. The region also has a dropout rate of 83% at the secondary level of education. The rarity of a child pursuing a secondary education beyond basic coursework in elementary school means that keeping children enrolled in school presents a significant obstacle.

Historically, high illiteracy rate has important ramification in shaping the education landscape of the state, especially that of school education. It was not until the first decade of the twenty-first century that large numbers of children from marginalised communities were enrolled in schools across the state. Many came from poor, lower-caste families and were the first in their families to receive an education. Among the many challenges they face, a particularly serious one is that their parents, who are often poor and illiterate, cannot help with schoolwork or afford private tutors. Numerous learning assessment reports show that schoolchildren’s learning levels are deeply unsatisfactory, especially those of first-generation learners. The state and all education stakeholders, including teachers, must therefore address these children’s historical and ongoing educational disadvantages and make a sustained, determined effort to ensure they have a fair opportunity to participate fully in the current education system.

The school system in Bihar lacks infrastructure, adequate teachers, and resources. Firstly, there is a shortage of qualified teachers. Only 55% of teachers teaching secondary school and 40% at the higher secondary level have adequate qualifications for their job. Furthermore, the majority of schools are lacking in resources and infrastructure. In 2016, approximately 0.8% of schools in Bihar had access to computers. In 2016, 30.7% of schools did not have library books available for students to use. Additionally, around 29.4% of schools did not have a toilet available and usable.

In Bihar, the education of women represents a significant problem. Issues such as gender inequality in India add an extra barrier that prevents schooling for young girls. Women's access to education is often hampered by societal and economic pressures. Around half of Biharis are literate; and there has been a 20% improvement in female literacy in the 21st century, bringing women on par with men. Due to the prevalence of gender roles, a young girl is likely destined to be married off, so there are often no perceived benefits of educating her. Child marriage represents a significant issue that is extremely prevalent in Bihar. The education of a young woman is not as critical as the education of a young man, because he is expected to provide for his family. In Bihar, over 24.5% of young girls aged 7–18 drop out of secondary school.

The gender wise dropout rates at high school level have improved since the 2010s, the current dropout rates are possibly exacerbated by Child Labour, which is especially prevalent in poor and low caste families.

Rural and impoverished face more challenges in Bihar's struggling education system. Urban areas have higher literacy rates than rural. Literacy rates are higher in the western and central urban areas of Bihar and the lowest in the northern and eastern regions of the state. The southern region lies in between. The urban literacy rate 83% while the rural literacy rate is 69.5%, showing improvement. Districts in rural areas tend to have a large population of impoverished Muslim communities. Rural communities are disproportionately affected by the education crisis because of the wealth disparities between rural and urban districts.

In the state's rural regions, parents understand the importance of educating their children; however, due to socio-cultural and economic factors, getting married or working often trumps receiving an education. In Bihar, the total number of children working more than six months a year is around 0.54 million, and there are approximately 0.58 million children who are working less than six months a year. Child labour presents a significant barrier that blocks children from receiving an education. Many children do not have educational opportunities or options available to them because they must work to support their families financially.

== See also ==
- Ministry of Education (Bihar)
- List of educational institutions in Bihar
- List of educational institutions in Patna
- List of schools in Patna
- Education in Uttarakhand
