= Government Tibbi College and Hospital, Patna =

- Type: Medical College and Hospital
- Established: 1926; 100 years ago
- Affiliations: Bihar University of Health and Science
- Principal: Prof. (Dr.) Md. Mehfoozur Rahman
- Location: Arya Rd, Budh Murti, New Area, Kadamkuna, Patna, Bihar, 800003, India; 25.608646°N 85.1497294°E
- Campus: Urban
- Website: www.gtch.ac.in
- Location in Bihar Government Tibbi College and Hospital, Patna (India)

Government Tibbi College and Hospital, Patna, established in 1926, is an Unani medical college situated in Patna, Bihar, India.

== History ==
Founded in 1926, the Tibbi College in Patna was the first Unani college established by the British government in India. A 50,000 rupee grant was allocated by the Government to establish the Tibbi College. In its founding year, a Unani dispensary opened and a library of Tibbi literature was established. In 1926, eleven students enrolled at the Tibbi College.

The initiative behind the founding of the college came from Syed Mohammad Fakhruddin (Education Minister of Bihar and Orissa) and Ganesh Dutt Singh (Minister of Local Self Government). Located in Kadamkuan, the college was founded in the same year as the Ayurvedic College (located just in front of it).

The college became a permanent institution on April 10, 1942, becoming upgraded to a Government College. The medium of instruction were Urdu and Arabic. The college had an outdoor shafakhana (dispensary) attached to it, as well as a library, herbarium, hostel and a museum of indigenous medicines. Between 1951 and 1970, Hakim Abdul Ahad was the Principal of the Government Tibbi College. As of the mid-1970s, the Government Tibbi College was governed by a 14-member board, with the Patna Division Commissioner as its president and the principal as its secretary.

In February-March 2003 students protests rocked the college, with demands for Patna Medical College and Hospital internships, hostel and new college building. Students seized control over the campus on March 10, 2003, holding the principal hostage for three hours. In October 2018 the 2013, 2014 and 2015 batch students locked the entrance gate of the college, protesting that their exam results had been delayed for over a year.

In May 2025 Chief Minister of Bihar Nitish Kumar laid the foundation stone at the construction site for a new building for the Government Tibbi College and Hospital, within the campus of the Nalanda Medical College and Hospital Centre of Excellence in Kadamkuan. Ten hectares were allocated to the new Government Tibbi College and Hospital. Costs for the construction was estimated at 2.64 billion Indian rupee, with a planned completion in 2027. Once the new campus would be completed the old installations of the Government Tibbi College and Hospital would be handed over to the Government Ayurvedic Medical College. The new hospital would have a 200-bed capacity. After the move, the new college facilities would have 150 students and a 500-seat auditorium.

In 2026 the Government Tibbi College announced the launch of a new outpatient clinic, providing six specialties.

== Academic profile ==
The college imparts the degree Bachelor of Unani Medicine and Surgery (BUMS), Postgraduate degrees in Moalajat (Medicine), Ilmul Advia (Pharmacology), Mahiyatul Amraz (Pathology), Tahaffuzi wa Samaji Tib (Preventive and Social Medicine), and Kulliyat (Principles of Unani Medicine). It also offers a one-year course of pre-tib. The college is affiliated to Bihar University of Health Sciences and is recognised by Medical Council of India.

== See also ==
- Education in India
- Education in Bihar
- List of educational institutions in Patna
- All India Council for Technical Education
