= Shri Ram Janki Medical College and Hospital, Samastipur =

Medical college and hospital in Bihar, India

- श्री राम जानकी मेडिकल कॉलेज एवं अस्पताल, समस्तीपुर
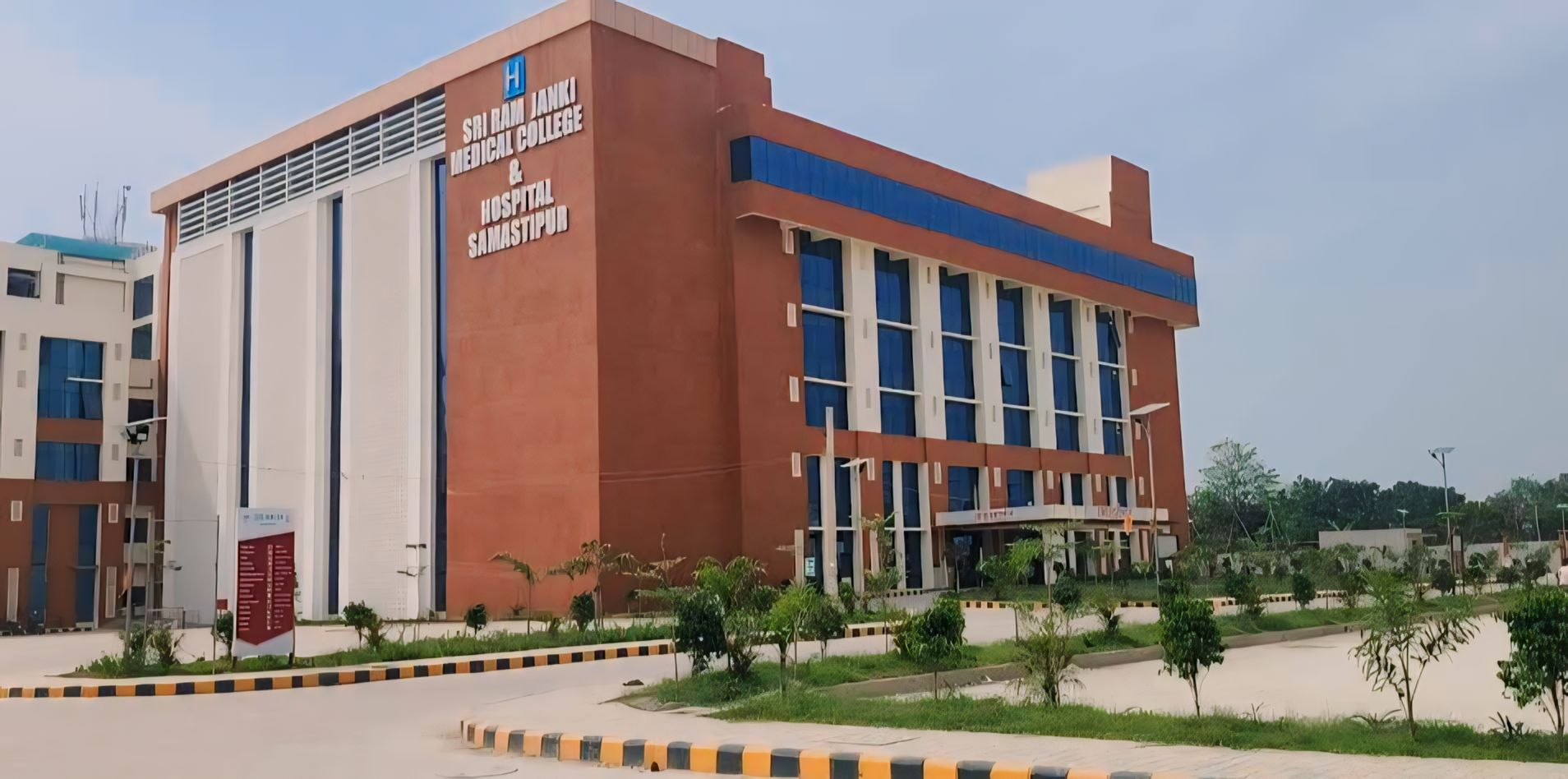
- Other name: SRJMCH SAMASTIPUR
- Type: Government
- Established: 2024; 2 years ago
- Affiliations: National Medical Commission
- Academic affiliations: Bihar University of Health Sciences
- Principal: Dr.(Prof.) Sudhir Kumar Karn
- Location: Sarairanjan, Samastipur district, Bihar, 848127, India; 25.723449°N 85.722577°E
- Campus: Rural

Shri Ram Janki Medical College and Hospital (abbreviated as SRJMCH, Samastipur) is a government medical college having multiple healthcare facilities and is located in Samastipur, Bihar, India. It was established in 2024. The college is currently affiliated with Bihar University of Health Sciences.

== History ==
The college is named after Lord Rama and Sita because the land has been donated by Shri Ram Janaki Math for the construction of this hospital, hence this hospital has been named Shri Ram Janaki Medical College and Hospital, to provide quality medical education and healthcare services to the people of Bihar.

== Infrastructure ==
Built at a cost of Rs 591 crore, Shri Ram Janki Medical College and Hospital (SRJMCH) has a 500-bed state-of-the-art hospital, equipped with all modern facilities. All its buildings are earthquake resistant. These buildings were constructed while following the environmental norms. The residential accommodation for the college principal, hospital superintendent, doctors, para-medical employees and students have been provided within the campus. A ‘dharmashala’ also has been built on the campus to provide temporary stay to the relatives of patients.

== Connectivity ==
The college & hospital is situated at Narghoghi, Sarairanjan near government engineering college and it is easily reachable by autos.

Nearby Bus Stop :-

- Sarairanjan Bus Stop :- 6-7 KM

Nearby Railway Station :-

- Samastipur Junction :- 20 KM
- Dalsinghsarai :- 16 KM

Nearby Airport :-

- Patna Airport :- 77 KM
- Darbhanga Airport :- 74 KM

== See also ==
- AIIMS Patna
- IGIMS Patna
- Patna Medical College and Hospital
- Nalanda Medical College and Hospital
- Darbhanga Medical College and Hospital
