= Government Pharmacy Institute, Patna =

Government Pharmacy Institute, Patna -07
- Type: Government
- Established: 1958; 68 years ago
- Affiliations: Bihar University of Health Sciences
- Principal: Dr. Ram Chaudhary
- Location: Agam Kuan, Gulzarbagh, Sadikpur, Patna, Bihar, 800007, India; 25.6011235°N 85.1987982°E
- Website: gpi.ac.in

Government Pharmacy Institute, Patna is a pharmacy college situated in Patna, Bihar.

== About college ==
It was established in 1958. Institute offers undergraduate and diploma courses in pharmacy. It is affiliated with Aryabhatta Knowledge University.

== See also ==
- Education in India
- Education in Bihar
- Chanakya College of Pharmacy and Medical Sciences, Bhojpur
- List of educational institutions in Patna
- All India Council for Technical Education
