= Mazharul Haque =

Mazharul Haque is the name of:

- Mazharul Haque (activist) (1866–1930), Indian educator, lawyer and independence activist
  - Maulana Mazharul Haque Arabic and Persian University, named after Mazharul Haque
- Mazharul Haque (cricketer) (1980–2013), Bangladeshi cricketer
- Mazharul Haque (educator) (1911–1974), Bangladeshi economist and academic
- Mazharul Haque Prodhan (born 1953), Bangladeshi politician
- Mazhar-Ul-Haque Khan (1923–1997), Pakistani athlete
- Md Mazharul Haque, Bangadeshi police officer

== See also ==
- Mazharul Haque Path, or Frazer Road, a neighbourhood in Patna, Bihar, India
