= MACET =

MACET may refer to:

Engineering Colleges in India:

- Maulana Azad College of Engineering and Technology, in Patna, Bihar
- Maharaja Agrasen College of Engineering and Technology, in J.P. Nagar, Uttar Pradesh
