= BASU =

BASU may refer to:

- Basu
- Bihar Animal Sciences University, India
- British Association Of Softball Umpires
- Bu-Ali Sina University, Iran
