= Murder of Rahul Kumar =

2025 murder in India

On the evening of August 5, 2025, in Darbhanga, Bihar, Rahul Kumar, a 25-year-old nursing student was murdered at Darbhanga Medical College and Hospital. According to report, Rahul, who was from lower caste was shot dead by his father-in-law Premshankar Jha who was against the inter-caste marriage of Rahul and his daughter Priya. Following the sound of the gunshot, students in the area surrounded and attacked the perpetrator, beating him unconscious. Later, Premshankar Jha was arrested by Darbhanga Police.

== Background ==
Tanu Priya, aged 22, and Rahul Kumar, aged 25, were students at Darbhanga Medical College and Hospital. Tanu was first-year Bsc Nursing Student and Second-year Bsc Nursing Student got married four months ago as they were both in love and were living in same hostel at different floors. However, Rahul belonged to Other backward caste (OBC) and Tanu Priya to Brahmin Family and this upset the family. Tanu's family were against the inter-caste marriage.

== Protest and Arrest ==
Following the Gunshot, a protest erupted on the campus, and Premshankar Jha was beaten up. Later, he was shifted to Patna Hospital for better treatment. Rahul, who was admitted to the hospital was not able to sustain the gun-shot wound and died. Darbhanga District Magistrate Kaushal Kumar and Senior Superintendent of Police Jagannath Reddy rushed to the hospital to take stock of the situation. A group of cops were deployed on the ground to keep the situation under control. Mr Reddy said, "We first got information that a BSc (Nursing) student had been shot dead. Later, we came to know that he and a fellow student had a love marriage. Her father came and shot him. There was a scuffle at the hospital because the students were not letting healthcare staff treat Jha. He is now being referred to Patna Medical College and Hospital. We will register a case and take necessary action."
