= Oriental College =

Oriental College may refer to:

- Government Muhammadan Anglo Oriental College, a public college in Lahore, Punjab, Pakistan
- Muhammadan Anglo-Oriental College, a primary school in Aligarh, Uttar Pradesh, India and predecessor to Aligarh Muslim University
- Oriental College of Eichstätt, an Eastern Catholic seminary and college under the jurisdiction of the Roman Catholic diocese of Eichstätt, Bavaria, Germany
- Oriental College, Imphal, an affiliated college of Manipur University in Imphal, Manipur, India
- Oriental College, Kohima, and affiliated college of Nagaland University in Lumami, Nagaland, India
- Oriental College, Lahore, an institution of oriental studies in Lahore, Pakistan
- Oriental College, Patna City, a minority degree college in Patna, Bihar, India
- Oriental College of Education, an affiliated college of University of Mumbai in Sanpada, Navi Mumbai, Maharashtra, India
- Oriental College of Pharmacy, an affiliated college of University of Mumbai in Sanpada, Navi Mumbai, Maharashtra, India
