= Bihar Veterinary College =

Indian veterinary school

Coordinates: 25°36′00″N 85°05′06″E

- Type: Public
- Established: 2 April 1927; 99 years ago
- Affiliations: Bihar Animal Science University
- Dean: J. K. Prasad
- Location: Patna, Bihar, India
- Website: www.basu.org.in/colleges/bihar-veterinary-college/

Bihar Veterinary College, established in 1927, is one of the oldest veterinary colleges of India located in Patna, Bihar. It is affiliated to Bihar Animal Science Bihar Animal Science University. It offers undergraduate and postgraduate courses in veterinary science.

== History ==
Bihar Veterinary College was founded by Sir Henry Wheeler - then Governor of Bihar & Orissa - as Bihar & Orissa Veterinary College in 1927. It is the fifth oldest veterinary college of undivided India. The college started functioning from 7 April 1927 and became fully operational in 1930.

R. T. Davis - Director of Veterinary Services Bihar and Orissa - was the first principal of the college and the college was known for its research in various branches of veterinary medicine such as - Breeding, Feeding, Management and Disease control of Livestock & Poultry species.

From 1930 to 1949 the college awarded a 3-year diploma as Graduate of Bihar Veterinary College (G.B.V.C) diploma. In 1949, the college started four-year degree courses with degrees of Bachelor of Veterinary Science and Animal Husbandry (B.V.Sc. & A.H). An emergency Diploma-Shift-Degree course was introduced in the year 1954-55. The college started Post graduate programmes in Veterinary Science and Animal Husbandry from 1960.

During the course of time, the college has been affiliated to various universities for awarding degrees. It has been affiliated to Bihar University and Magadh University before it came under Rajendra Agricultural University, Pusa in 1971 under the provisions of Bihar Agricultural University Act (1971). Since 2010, the college is affiliated to Bihar Agricultural University.

== Departments ==
The college has a total of 17 departments as of 2018.

- Animal Breeding & Genetics
- Animal Nutrition
- Animal Reproduction Gynaecology & Obstetrics
- Livestock Production & Management
- Livestock Products Technology
- Veterinary & Animal Husbandry Extension
- Veterinary Anatomy & Histology
- Veterinary Biochemistry
- Veterinary Clinical Medicine, Ethics & Jurisprudence
- Veterinary Epidemiology & Preventive Medicine
- Veterinary Microbiology
- Veterinary Parasitology
- Veterinary Pathology
- Veterinary Pharmacology & Toxicology
- Veterinary Physiology
- Veterinary Public Health
- Veterinary Surgery and Radiology

== Location ==
The college is located on Patna Airport-Ashiana More Road. Sanjay Gandhi Jaivik Udyan and Jay Prakash Narayan International Airport are located on the east end of the college campus while Bihar Military Police campus is on the west end of the campus.

== Buildings and Facilities ==
The main building is located on the Patna Airport main road with front entrance in the south direction. Across the main road is the Bihar veterinary College Ground. On the west side of the main building are college rest house, guest house and the girl's hostel. Veterinary clinical complex is located on the east side of the main building. The clinical complex is used for treatment of sick animals. The classrooms and laboratories are situated behind the main administrative building. Boy's Hostel is situated on the northern part of the campus.

The college also houses a double storeyed library building with an area of 14,000 sq ft. The air conditioned library is well equipped with books and magazines - a total of 21,259 books and 5,000 bound periodicals. Apart from this the library subscribes to journals, magazines and newspapers. The library also has the facility of E-Library for students of the college.
