= R.P. Sharma Institute of Technology =

Coordinates: 25.6043°N 85.0480°E

- Former name: Patna Institute of Technology
- Motto: ज्ञानेन शोभामहे
- Motto in English: Knowledge is only real beauty
- Type: Private
- Established: 1980
- Affiliations: Bihar Engineering University
- Chairman: Kumar Puspanjay
- Director: Manoj Kumar (2021 to present)
- Faculty: 100
- Administrative staff: 100
- Students: 1200
- Undergraduates: 1200
- Location: RPS road, Danapur, Patna, Bihar, India
- Campus: Urban
- Nickname: RPSIT Patna
- Website: rpsit.org.in

R.P. Sharma Institute of Technology (RPSIT) (formerly Patna Institute of Technology) is an engineering and management college in Patna, the state capital of Bihar. It was founded by R.P. Sharma (founder of Patna Educational Development Trust) in 1980. The institution offers full-time B.Tech. and MBA courses.

It is affiliated with Bihar Engineering University, Patna.

== Campus ==
The campus of RPSIT is spread over 10 acres of land situated on West Bailey Road near RPS road in Danapur Patna. This location has many colleges and schools of the Patna Educational Development Trust. It is one of the oldest privately owned engineering college in Bihar and the first in Patna.

== Departments ==
- Computer Science and Engineering
- Electronics and Communications Engineering
- Electrical and Electronics Engineering
- Mechanical engineering
- Civil engineering
- MBA Department

== Admission ==
Admission to undergraduate courses is made on the basis of merit in a competitive examination conducted by the Bihar Combined Entrance Competitive Examination Board. And 15% management quota seats filled by college by its own examination test.

== Library ==
The college has a library containing books and magazines available for college students.

== See also ==
- List of institutions of higher education in Bihar
- Education in Patna
- Education in Bihar
