= DMCH =

DMCH may refer to:

- Darbhanga Medical College and Hospital
- Dhaka Medical College and Hospital
