= Maulana Azad College of Engineering and Technology =

Engineering college in Bihar

- Motto: رب زدنی علما (Arabic)
- Type: Engineering
- Established: 1988
- Director: Asim Kumar
- Location: Patna, Bihar, India
- Affiliations: Bihar Engineering University
- Website: www.macet.net.in

Maulana Azad College of Engineering and Technology (MACET) is an engineering institute in the city of Patna, Bihar, India. The college was preiviously affiliated to Aryabhatta Knowledge University, now it's affiliated to Bihar Engineering University and approved by All India Council for Technical Education. It is also recognized by the Department of Science and Technology, Government of Bihar.

The campus is 20 km (12 mi) from Patna Junction and 16 km (9.9 mi) from Patna Airport, Patna, Neora, on an 18-acre (7.3 ha) campus.

== Foundation ==
The college was founded by the Milat Education Society, Patna in 1988. It is the oldest private engineering college in Bihar.

=== Governance ===
The college is governed by the governing body of the college, whose president is Dr. Ahmad Abdul Hai, a surgeon of Patna, secretary Md. Ehsan Ahmad (Retd. IAS), and eight other members.

=== Administration ===
The administration of the college is run by a team consisting of 14 members, whose head is the Director of MACET.

== Academics ==
MACET offers five engineering courses in the following discipline :

- Computer Science and Engineering
- Mechanical Engineering
- Civil Engineering
- Electrical Engineering
- Electronics Engineering

== See also ==
- Education in Bihar
- Education in Patna
