= Amity University, Patna =

State private university in Patna, India

- Type: State Private University
- Established: 18 August 2017; 9 years ago
- Affiliations: UGC
- Chancellor: Dr. Atul K. Chauhan
- Vice-Chancellor: Dr. Vivekanand Pandey
- Location: Priyadarshi Nagar near Rupaspur, Bailey Road, Patna, Bihar, 801503, India; 25.6121752°N 85.0535493°E
- Campus: urban
- Language: English
- Colors: Blue and Yellow
- Mascot: Flambeau
- Website: amity.edu/patna/
- Location in Patna, India

Amity University is a state private university located in Patna, India. The university was established in 2017 by the Amity Education Group through the Bihar Private University (Amendment) Bill, 2017. It offers various undergraduate and postgraduate courses. The university additionally operates Amity Global Business School in Patna.

== Campus ==
Amity University Patna's campus is located at Priyadarshi Nagar near Rupaspur on Bailey Road, Patna.

== See also ==
- List of educational institutions in Patna
