= Ganesh Dutt =

Indian lawyer, educationist and administrator

Sir Ganesh Dutta Singh
- Born: 13 January 1868 Nalanda District, Bihar
- Died: 26 September 1943 Patna, Bihar
- Occupation(s): Indian lawyer, educationist and administrator

Sir Ganesh Dutta Singh (variously, Ganesh Dutt, Ganesh Dutt Singh; 13 January 1868 – 26 September 1943) was an Indian lawyer, educationist and administrator during the British Raj. He did much to improve education and health services in the state of Bihar and Orissa before the independence of India from Britain.

Dutta made generous donations from his earnings and personal property for the development of educational institutions, Darbhanga Medical College and Hospital, Ayurvedic College and schools for the blind and deaf. A short film based on the life and works of Dutta was made by Prakash Jha.

Dutta was Minister for Local Self Government of Bihar and Orissa under British rule, and one of the major public figures of the province of Bihar. Sir Ganesh Dutta donated his house Krishna Kunj to Patna University to start the Patna University Institute of Psychological Research and Service, one of the oldest psychological service centres in Eastern India in 1945 on the initiative of Sir Chandeshwar Prasad Narayan Singh Sinha, the Vice-Chancellor of Patna University. Dutta saved nearly three-quarters of his salary each month for 14 years to give it to various charities to benefit orphans, widows, and schools in the state.

He took keen interest in the development of Patna University. He donated some of his assets to the University and worked towards abolishing the practice of appointing former Judges as vice-chancellors; Sachchidanand Sinha became the first VC of Patna University who was not a judge.

== Biography ==
Dutta was the Minister of Local Self Government in the British Raj cabinet from 1923 till 1937 when the Provincial Government was established. While he was the Minister of Local Self Government, Dutta was made Knight Bachelor by the British government for his contributions to the public good. State functions are organised by the Government of Bihar on the anniversary of Dutta's birth on 13 January every year.

Dutta was a minister of Bihar and Orissa until 31 March 1936. After the separation of Orissa and Bihar he continued to hold the position. He became minister on 27 March 1923 and five years later in June 1928, he was knighted by the King Emperor, in recognition of his ability as an administrator and his service to the country. He retired from ministership on the introduction of provincial autonomy in 1937 after having held office continuously for 14 years from 1923.

== Philanthropy ==
During Dutta's period of office as minister, he set apart most of his salary for charitable and educational purposes. He gave Rs. 100,000 to Patna University on 30 November 1931, and a further Rs. 200,000 on 27 May 1933.

With this endowment the Patna University Sir Ganesh Dutta Singh's Trust Fund was created, funding loan scholarships for higher studies in industry, agriculture, science, medicine, engineering, etc. Dutta required that all else being equal, preference was to be given to the untouchable castes and backward castes over the forward castes.

Patna University awarded him the degree of Doctor Honouris Causa in 1933.

== Policy criticism ==
In 1928, there had been widespread agitation in Bihar due to an ill-advised step on the part of the ruling British Government in superseding the District Board at Gaya and removing Anugraha Narain Sinha, a prominent national leader, from its chairmanship. Sri Krishna Sinha (first Chief Minister of Bihar), leader of the Congress party, disapproved of the policy of Ganesh Dutta Singh as Minister of the Local-Self Government in superseding the Gaya district board, and came down heavily on the government in the Bihar and Orissa Legislative council.
