= Munger Forestry College =

Bihar Forestry College and Research Institute, Munger, also known as Munger Forestry College, established in 2022, is an Indian college in Munger district of Bihar. It is affiliated with Bihar Agricultural University Sabour, Bhagalpur and is the first forestry college in Bihar.

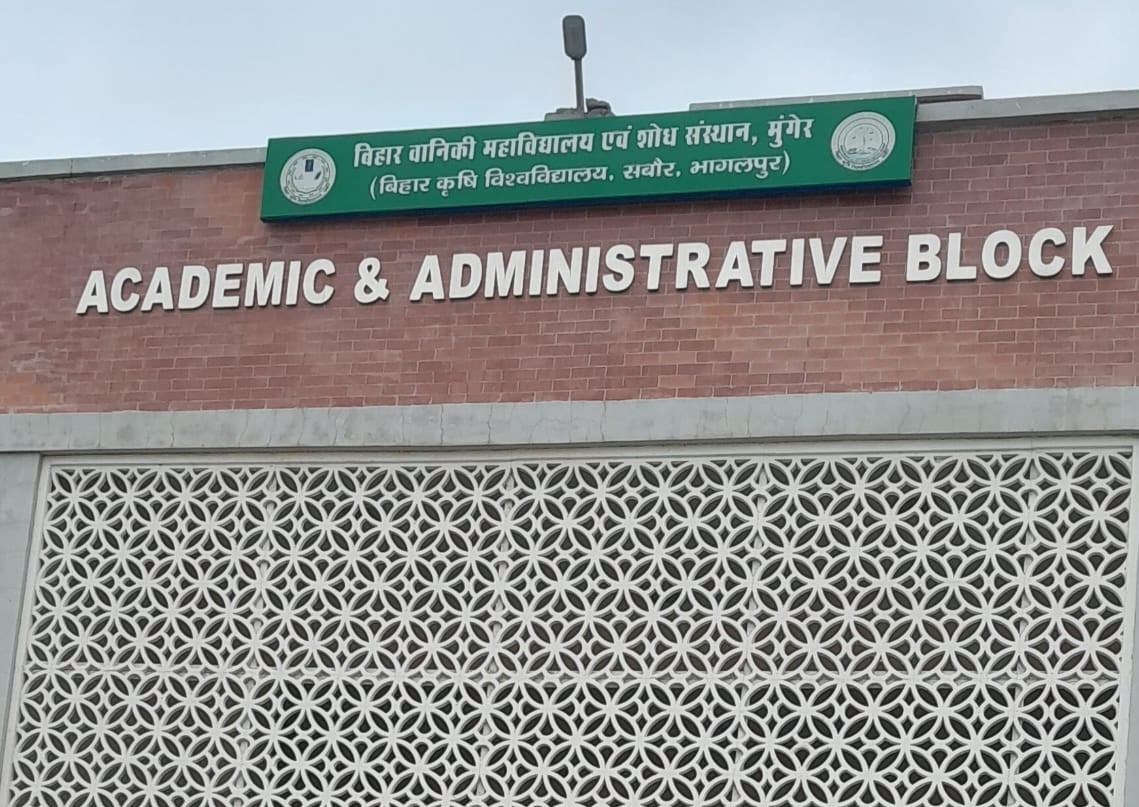

Chief Minister Nitish Kumar laid the foundation stone and inaugurated the institution.
