= Nalanda Medical College and Hospital =

Hospital in India

Nalanda Medical College & Hospital
- Type: Government
- Established: 1970; 56 years ago
- Affiliations: Bihar University of Health Sciences
- Principal: Dr. Usha Kumari
- Location: Patna, Bihar, India; 25.6002794°N 85.1733161°E
- Website: http://nmchpatna.org/

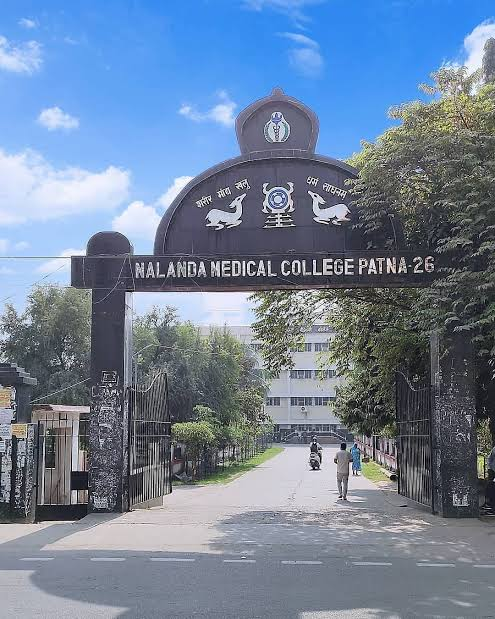
Nalanda Medical College and Hospital

Nalanda Medical College and Hospital (abbreviated as NMCH) is a public medical college in Patna, Bihar, India. The institute was established in 1970 and is situated in Kankarbagh. It is a government-funded institute affiliated to Bihar University of Health science, Patna. It is recognized by National Medical Commission.

The medical college had a capacity of 100 students in each batch until 2018. Since 2019 session the intake capacity has been increased to 120 students. Its session intake capacity is now increased from 120 to 150 for the year 2020.

It offers undergraduate courses MBBS as well as post-graduate courses in medicine, surgery, gynaecology, anaesthesiology, pediatrics, dermatology, orthopedics, ENT, preventive and social medicine, pathology, pharmacology, forensic medicine and toxicology, microbiology, physiology, and biochemistry.

== History ==
Nalanda Medical College, Patna, was established in 1970 as a government medical college. It was established by Dr. Vijay Narayain Singh, Dr. Madhusudan Das and Dr. Shailendra Kumar Sinha, along with Shri Krishna Kant Singh, the ex-education minister of Bihar.

== Hospital ==
The hospital has about 750 normal beds and 200 emergency beds. It has two campuses spread over 100 acres. The college campus at Bhoothnath has an administrative building, UG hostels (for boys and girls), a college library, lecture theatre and buildings for non-clinical and para-clinical subjects and doctors' quarters. The hospital campus at Agamkuan beside RMRI has hospital buildings, a centre of excellence, vaccine house, and hostel for interns, Pgs, and nursing students.

Centre of excellence is located at hospital campus where all types of diagnostics and investigation services are done and a blood bank is also present there. It has two auditoriums, one at the college campus and another one at the hospital campus. It has a seminar hall which is fully air-conditioned with a multimedia projector and other audio-video aids.

At hospital campus the following services are provided:

- OPD and IPD services
- Counselling
- Diagnostic and investigation services
- Teaching for undergraduates and postgraduates
- NMCH provides degree courses in MBBS, MS, MD and it also provides Bsc.nursing degree and ANM, GNM training.

The college offers the four-and-a-half-year M.B.B.S. course with a one-year compulsory rotating internship in affiliated hospitals. The undergraduate seats are filled through a single-window all-India medical test known as NEET-UG of which 85% admissions are done by the BCECE at the state level and 15% through NEET counselling at the national level.

The college offers more than 80 seats in postgraduate courses.

== Connectivity ==
The college is situated at Kankarbagh Road near Bazar Samiti, and is easily reachable by autos. The hospital is situated in Agamkuan.

Distance from:

- Patna Junction: 5–6 km
- Airport: 13–14 km
- Mithapur Bus Stand: 8–9 km

== Notable alumni ==
- Pranava Prakash, artist

== See also ==
- Education in India
- Education in Bihar
- Indira Gandhi Institute of Medical Sciences
- Patna Medical College and Hospital
- Lord Buddha Koshi Medical College and Hospital
- Sri Krishna Medical College and Hospital
- Darbhanga Medical College and Hospital
