= Jannayak Karpoori Thakur Medical College and Hospital, Madhepura =

Medical school in Bihar, India

Jannayak Karpoori Thakur Medical College and Hospital
- Type: Government
- Established: 2020; 6 years ago
- Affiliations: National Medical Commission
- Academic affiliations: Bihar University of Health Sciences
- Principal: Dr. Dinesh Kumar
- Location: Madhepura, Bihar, 852113, India; 25.957640°N 86.795792°E
- Website: https://jnktmchmadhepura.org/

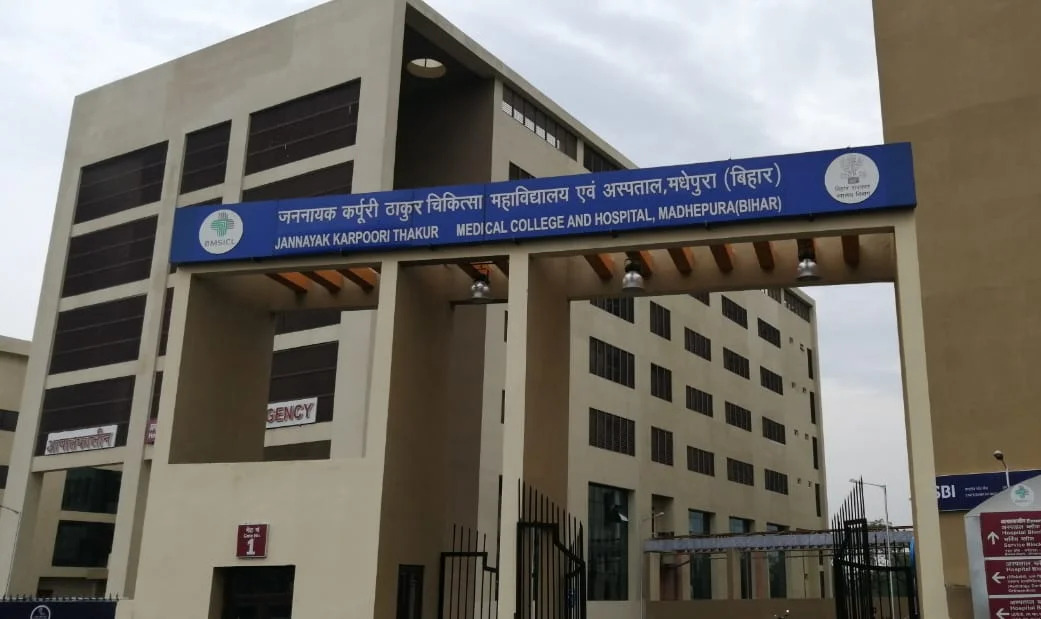
JNKTMCH Main Gate

Jannayak Karpoori Thakur Medical College and Hospital (abbreviated as JNKTMCH), established in 2020, is a government medical college and hospital located at Madhepura, Bihar, India. This college offers the Bachelor of Medicine and Surgery (MBBS) courses and has an annual intake capacity of 100. This college is affiliated with the Bihar University of Health Sciences and recognized by the National Medical Commission. The hospital associated with this college is the largest hospital in the Madhepura, Bihar.

== See also ==
- List of hospitals in India
