= Government Medical College and Hospital, Chapra =

Medical college and hospital in Bihar, India

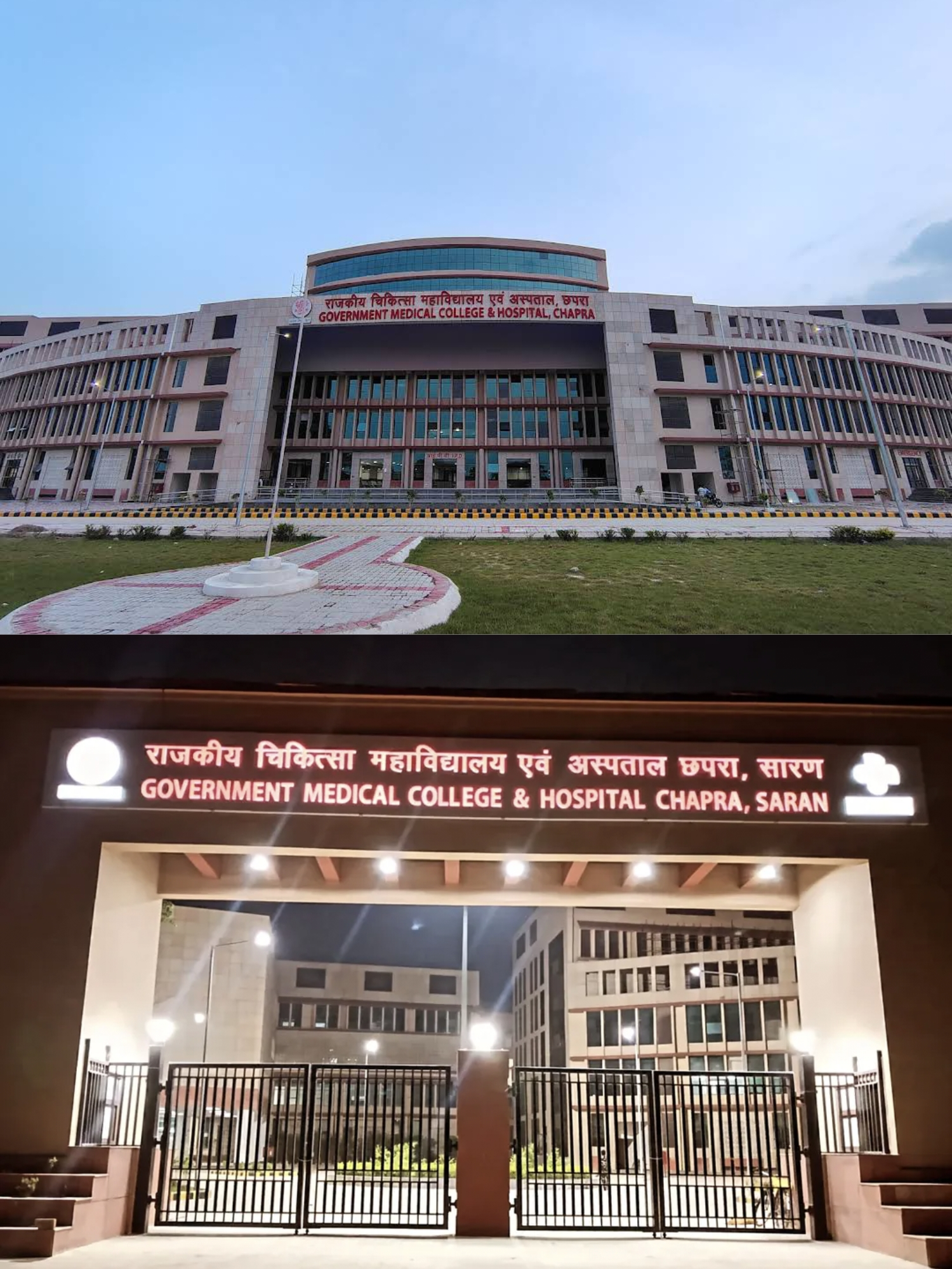
- GMCH, Chapra
- Type: Government
- Established: 2025; 1 year ago
- Academic affiliations: Bihar University of Health Sciences
- Principal: Dr. Chand Prakash Jaiswal
- Location: Chapra, Saran district, Bihar, India; 25.783179°N 84.785246°E
- Campus: Urban

Government Medical College and Hospital, Chapra (abbreviated as GMCH, Chapra) is a newly established government medical college and teaching hospital located in Chapra, Saran district, Bihar, India. It was inaugurated by Chief Minister of Bihar Mr. Nitish Kumar on 8th Jan 2025 and is intended to serve as a major centre for medical education and tertiary healthcare in the region. The teaching hospital is planned with a capacity of 500 beds, while the college offers 50 MBBS seats annually.

== History ==
The Government of Bihar approved the establishment of a medical college in Chapra as part of a larger plan to expand healthcare infrastructure in the state. The project was built on land provided by Jai Prakash University, Chapra, at a cost of ₹425 crore. Construction was completed by late 2024, and the college was officially inaugurated in January 2025. OPD and IPD services became functional soon after inauguration.

== Campus ==
The campus of GMC Chapra covers approximately 20–25 acres and includes academic, hospital, residential, and ancillary blocks.

The major infrastructure includes:

- Academic Block
- Hospital Block
- Lecture theatres
- Laboratories and skill centres
- Library
- Administrative Block
- Student and intern hostels (under development)
- Residential quarters for faculty and staff

=== Hospital and Academic Facilities ===
- Hospital Block: Ground + multiple floors
- Academic Block: Lecture halls, labs, library, dissection hall

=== Ancillary Facilities ===
- Dharamshala for patient attendants
- Cafeteria and public utilities
- Recreational areas

=== Residential Facilities ===
- Boys' Hostel
- Girls' Hostel
- Intern Hostel
- Junior Resident Hostel
- Faculty quarters

== Hospital ==
The attached teaching hospital is planned with a 500-bed capacity and serves patients from Saran, Siwan, Gopalganj, and neighbouring districts.

Major facilities include:

- Emergency and trauma services
- Outpatient (OPD) and inpatient (IPD) departments
- Operation theatres
- Radiology and diagnostics
- Maternal and child health units
- Pathology and microbiology labs

== Academics ==
The college currently offers:

- MBBS – 50 seats annually*
- B.Sc. Nursing – 60 seats (proposed)

The MBBS programme follows the standard 4.5 years of academic study plus 1-year internship.

== Departments ==
The institution hosts the standard pre-clinical, para-clinical, and clinical departments, including:

- Anatomy
- Physiology
- Biochemistry
- Pathology
- Pharmacology
- Microbiology
- Forensic Medicine
- Community Medicine
- General Medicine
- General Surgery
- Obstetrics and Gynaecology
- Paediatrics
- Orthopaedics
- Ophthalmology
- ENT
- Radiology
- Anaesthesiology
- Dermatology
- Psychiatry

== See also ==
- Sri Krishna Medical College and Hospital
- All India Institute of Medical Sciences, Patna
- Patna Medical College and Hospital
- Lord Buddha Koshi Medical College and Hospital
- IGIMS Patna
- Homi Bhabha Cancer Hospital and Research Centre, Muzaffarpur
