= Animal Genetics =

- Discipline: Genetics
- Language: English
- Edited by: Chris Moran

Publication details
- History: 1987–present
- Publisher: Wiley-Blackwell (UK)
- Frequency: Bi-Monthly
- Impact factor: 1.779 (2015)

Standard abbreviations
- ISO 4: Anim. Genet.

Indexing
- ISSN: 1365-2052

Links
- Journal homepage

Animal Genetics is a bi-monthly scientific journal published by the Wiley-Blackwell on behalf of the International Society for Animal Genetics.

The impact factor of Animal Genetics is 2.605 (2009) making the journal number 9, out of 50, in the Thomson Reuters ISI "Agriculture, Dairy & Animal Science" category.

Animal Genetics publishes research on immunogenetics, molecular genetics and functional genomics of economically important and domesticated animals. Publications include the study of variability at gene and protein levels, mapping of gene, traits and QTLs, associations between genes and traits, genetic diversity, and characterization of gene expression and control.

== Notes ==
All organisms in the Kingdom Animalia are multicellular heterotroph's that are also eukaryotes.
