= Mazharul Haque (activist) =

Indian freedom fighter

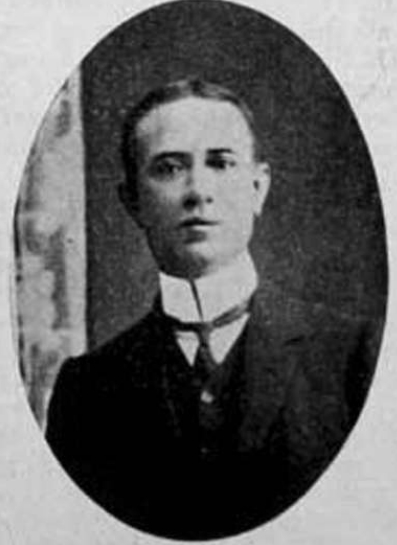
- Born: 22 December 1866; Bahpura, Patna, Bihar
- Died: 2 January 1930 (aged 63); Saran, India
- Occupations: Theologian, educationist, political activist, freedom fighter and lawyer
- Political party: Indian National Congress

Mazharul Haque (22 December 1866 – 2 January 1930) was an educator, lawyer, independence activist of the Indian National Movement.

Throughout his career, Mazharul Haque was a proponent of Hindu-Muslim unity. The first president of India, Rajendra Prasad, dedicated his book, India Divided to his memory and described him as a "devout Muslim and passionate patriot".

== Early life and education ==
Haque was born on 22 December 1866 in Bahpura, Patna, Bihar into a middle-class family of small zamindars and indigo planters. His family had their origins in Daudnagar of Muzaffarpur district before later shifting to Bahpura.

As was the tradition of Muslims and Kayasthas of the time, he received an education from a Maulvi in both Urdu and Persian. He passed his middle school examination in 1871 and was subsequently admitted into Patna Collegiate School. After passing his matriculation exam in 1886, he gained admission into Patna College but due to a disagreement with a teacher, later left and joined the prestigious Canning College in Lucknow where he remained until 1887. From September 1888 he left for London and returned in June 1891 after graduating in law.

== Life after 1891 ==
Upon his return to India as a barrister in 1891, he joined the judicial services. In 1896, he started practicing as a lawyer. By 1906, he had left Chhapra and started practicing in Patna, and in the same year was elected vice-president of the Bihar Congress Committee.

In 1910 and 1911 he was elected as a member of the Imperial Legislative Council of India. In 1911, a third "Bihar State Conference" was held under the chairmanship of the Maulana at the conference to demand a separate Bihar state.

He played an active role in the Treaty of Indian National Congress and the Muslim League in 1916. He joined the Home Rule Movement started by Annie Besant in 1916 and actively participated in the Champaran Satyagraha in 1917. Mahatma Gandhi's guest visited his home "Sikandar Manzil" in Patna.

In 1919, he was active in the Khilafat Movement and in 1920 he joined the Non-Cooperation Movement on Gandhi's call. In 1921, Gandhiji was impressed and established the "Sadaqat Ashram" (abode of truth) in Patna. From the same ashram, Haque started a weekly magazine called "Motherland". He was a strong advocate of Hindu-Muslim unity. His statement was "Whether we are Hindus or Muslims, we are on the same boat. If we overcome, we will sink, we will sink together".

He announced his retirement from active politics in 1926, but still continued to correspond with leaders like Mahatma Gandhi, Maulana Azad and Nehru. He died on 2 January 1930. A residential colony in Siwan is named after him.

== Personal life ==
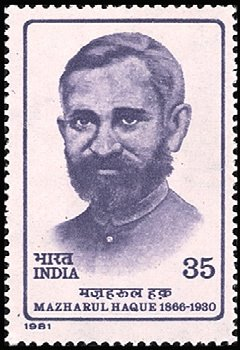
A Commomemorative postal stamp issued by India Post in 1981

Mazharul Haque was married three times. His first marriage was in 1892 to Gauthia Begam of the village of Kharsanti in Uttar Pradesh however she died childless in 1902. His second marriage was to a Kishwar Jahan and together they had two sons, Hasan and Husain however Kishwar died in 1912. His third and final marriage was to a Munira Begum in 1917 and she died in 1976, many years after her husband. They were introduced to each other by Sarojini Naidu.

A stamp was issued in his honour by the Indian Postal Service in 1981 and in 1998, Maulana Mazharul Haque Arabic and Persian University was established in Patna in his memory.

He constructed a house in Faridpur, Siwan, Bihar and named it Ashiyana. It was visited by many nationalists, including Rajendra Prasad and Mahatma Gandhi.

== Cited Sources ==
- Prasad, Rajendra (1946). India Divided.
- Kumar, Nirmal (2009). Mazharul Haque- A Political Biography. ISBN 9788190761307.
