= British Lingua =

Chain of English-language schools in Patna, India

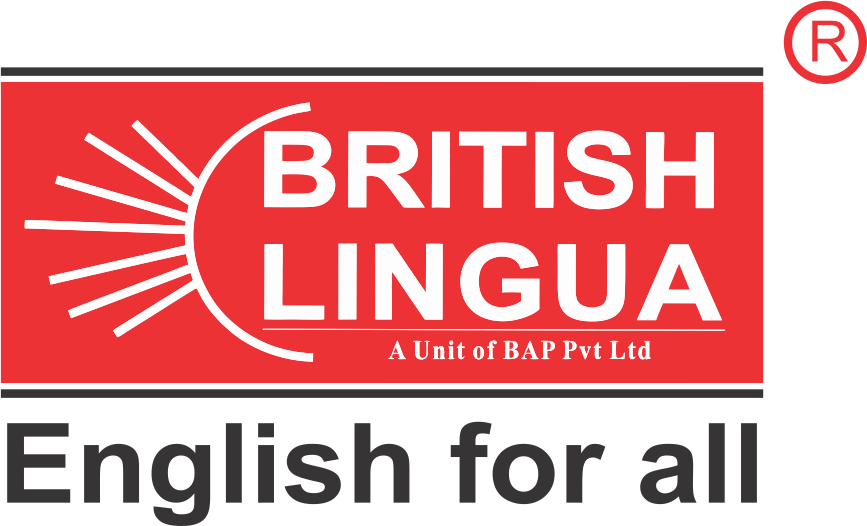
- Industry: Education
- Founded: 1993
- Founder: Birbal Jha
- Headquarters: Delhi, India

British Lingua is a chain of English-language schools in Patna, India, founded in 1993. It teaches both the English language and soft communication skills.

== Function ==
British Lingua was established in 1993 by Birbal Jha, who in 2014 was its managing director.

According to its website, the purpose of British Lingua is to "provide unfettered access to the study of English for all sections of society" in India. It also teaches soft skills, such as personality development and interview techniques, and it trains the teachers who teach the English language.

== Achievements ==
In 2011, a project called the Spoken English Skills and Capacity Building Training programme was introduced in four districts of Bihar state for high-school teachers employed by the government. British Lingua was also commissioned by the Government of Bihar to implement the first Spoken English Skills project for Dalit and Mahadalit youths with an aim to enhance their employability skills and lifestyles.

The Government of Delhi also used the services of British Lingua for the 2010 Commonwealth Games to train the Delhi Home Guards in spoken English and behavioural skills.
