= National Institute of Health Education & Research =

Nursing school in Bihar, India

National Institute of Health Education & Research Patna
- Other name: NIHER
- Established: 1998
- Academic affiliations: Aryabhatta Knowledge University, BNRC, Govt. Of Bihar, NIOS,
- Location: Patna, Bihar, India
- Campus: Urban
- Website: niher.org

The National Institute of Health Education & Research Patna (NIHER) is located in IDH Colony, Gulzarbagh, Patna. This institution imparts education in nursing, physiotherapy, and paramedical courses from diploma, degree to masters level. Courses available are nursing : M.SC (nursing), P.B.SC (nursing), B.SC (nursing), G.N.M, A.N.M., for physiotherapy: DPT, BPT AND MPT, for paramedical BMLT, BMRIT, BOTA, DMLT, DRIT, DECG, DOTA, DSI, CMD etc.
