= Education in Uttarakhand =

Department of Education

General details
- Primary languages: Hindi, English
- System type: Federal, state, private
- Established Compulsory education: 1 April 2010

Literacy (2011)
- Total: 78.82%
- Male: 87.40%
- Female: 70.01%

Education in Uttarakhand is provided by various public and private institutions. Uttarakhand had a long tradition of learning and culture.

== Detail ==
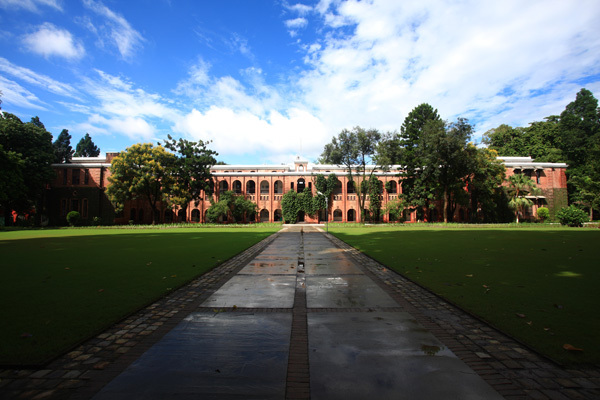
Main building of The Doon School

In Uttarakhand there are 15,331 primary schools with 1,040,139 students and 22,118 working teachers (Year 2011). As per 2011 Census of India, the literacy rate of the state was 78.82% with 87.40% literacy for males and 70.01% literacy for females. The language of instruction in the schools is either English or Hindi.

There are mainly government and private schools and institutions including primary schools, high schools, inter college, degree colleges and technical institutions. The main school affiliations are CBSE, CISCE or the State Government syllabus defined by the Department of Education of the Government of Uttarakhand.

== Notable schools and Institutions ==
There are many notable schools and institutions in Uttarakhand.

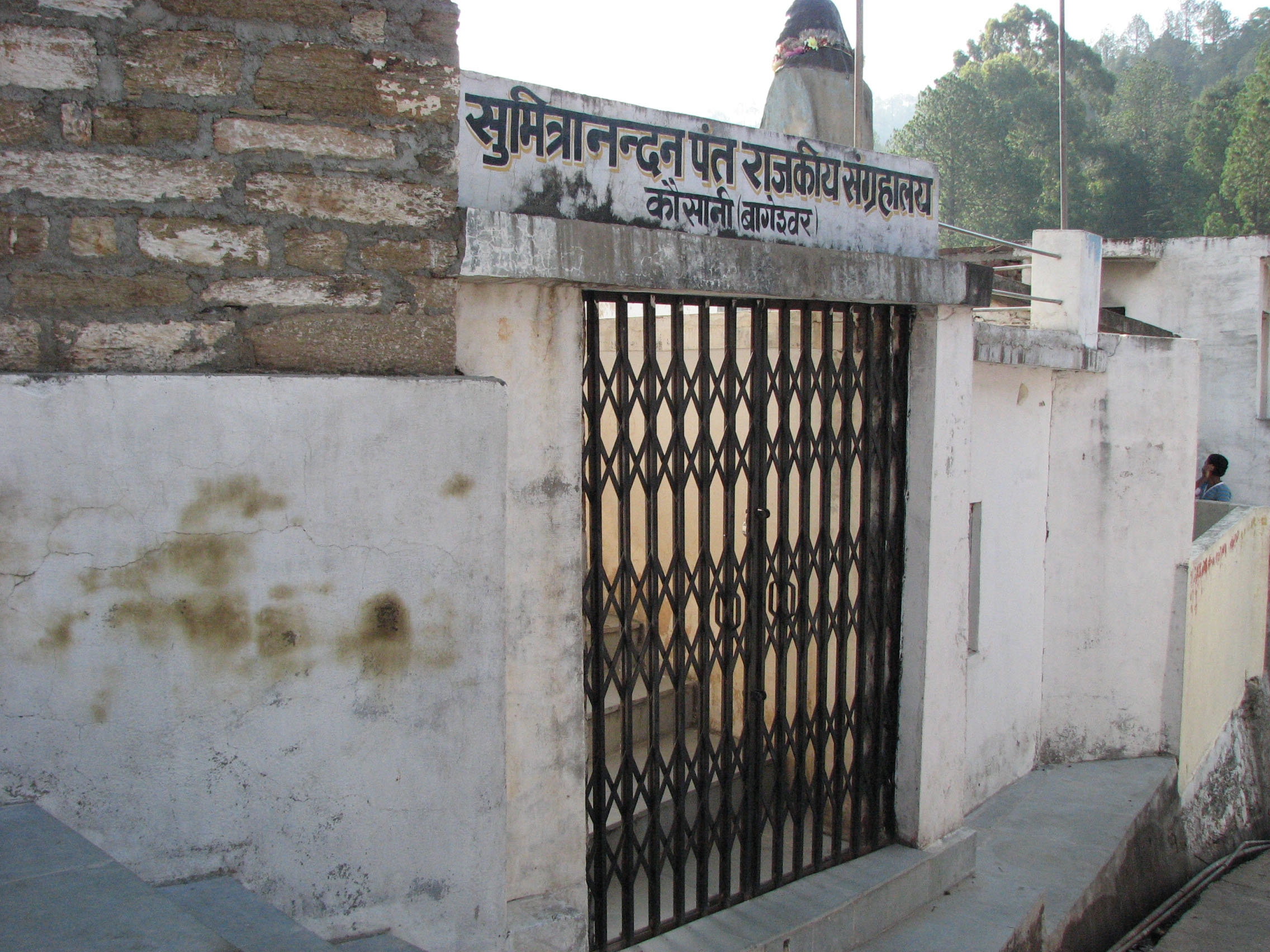
Sumitranandan Pant museum, Kausani

- The Doon School Dehradun
- Sherwood College, Nainital
- The Woodstock School Mussoorie
- Oak Grove School (Mussoorie, Uttarakhand), Mussoorie
- St George's College, Mussoorie
- Colonel Brown Cambridge School Dehradun
- Convent of Jesus and Mary, Waverley, Mussoorie
- Wynberg Allen School, Mussoorie
- St Joseph's College, Nainital
- Birla Vidya Mandir, Nainital
- Welham Girls' School, Dehradun
- Welham Boys' School, Dehradun
- St Joseph's Academy, Dehradun
- Sainik School, Ghorakhal
- Lal Bahadur Shastri National Academy of Administration, Mussoorie
- Forest Research Institute, Dehradun
- Indira Gandhi National Forest Academy (IGNFA), Dehradun
- Wildlife Institute of India Dehradun
- Indian Military Academy, Dehradun
- Graphic Era Hill University, Dehradun

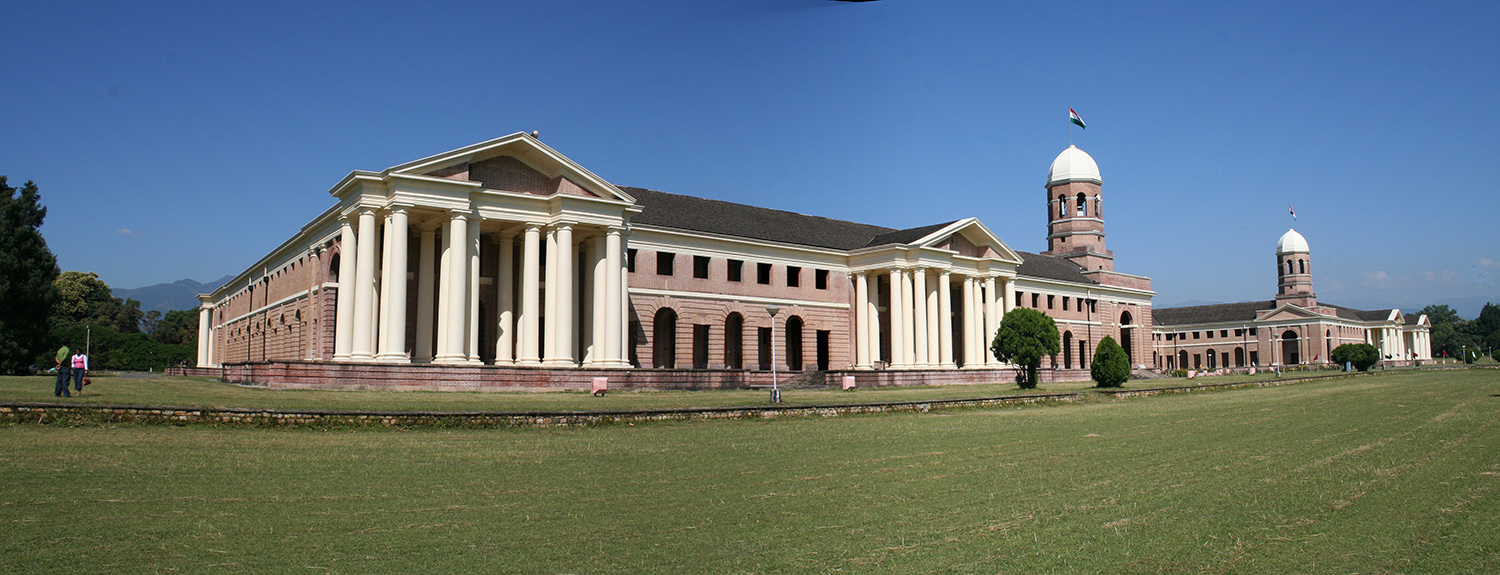
Forest Research Institute, Dehradun, distant view.
