= Physiotherapy: Theory and Practice =

- Discipline: Physiotherapy
- Language: English
- Edited by: Scott Hasson

Publication details
- History: 1985-present
- Publisher: Informa
- Frequency: 8/year

Standard abbreviations
- ISO 4: Physiother. Theory Pract.

Indexing
- CODEN: PTHPEA
- ISSN: 0959-3985 (print); 1532-5040 (web)
- LCCN: 98658551
- OCLC no.: 474752352

Links
- Journal homepage; Online access; Online archive

Physiotherapy: Theory and Practice is a peer-reviewed medical journal covering research in physiotherapy (physical therapy). It is published 8 times a year by Informa. The journal was established in 1985 and the editor-in-chief is Scott Hasson (Georgia Health Sciences University).

== Article types ==
The journal publishes:

- Quantitative and qualitative research reports
- Theoretical papers
- Systematic literature reviews
- Clinical case reports
- Technical clinical notes

== Abstracting and indexing ==
The journal is abstracted and indexed in:

- Academic Search Complete
- Biological Abstracts
- BIOSIS Previews
- CINAHL
- EMBASE
- EmCare
- MedLine/PubMed
- Science Citation Index Expanded
- Scopus
