= Patna Women's Training College =

College in Bihar

- Type: Public
- Chancellor: Shri Fagu Chauhan
- Vice-Chancellor: Prof. Girish Kumar Choudhary website = Patna Women's Training College
- Location: Patna, Bihar, India
- Affiliations: Patna University

Patna Women's Training College is a women's B.Ed. college situated in Patna, Bihar. The college, under Patna University, is also approved by the National Council for Teacher Education (NCTE) and the University Grants Commission (UGC).

== See also ==
- List of teacher education schools in India
