= Catalyst Institute of Management and Advance Global Excellence =

College in Bihar, India

- Other name: CIMAGE
- Motto: Knowledge . Skill . Success
- Type: Private
- Established: 2009; 17 years ago
- Academic affiliations: Aryabhatta Knowledge University, Patliputra University
- Principal: Megha Agrawal
- Dean: Neeraj Poddar
- Director: Neeraj Agrawal
- Academic staff: 100
- Administrative staff: 40
- Undergraduates: 700
- Postgraduates: 400
- Location: Patna, Bihar, India
- Campus: Urban
- Address: CIMAGE College, Boring Road, Behind Sri Krishna Puri Park, Patna, Bihar 800001
- Website: www.cimage.in

Catalyst Institute of Management and Advance Global Excellence (CIMAGE) is a college located in Patna, Bihar, India.

CIMAGE is known for its commitment to providing industry-oriented education with a strong focus on employability and skill development,

It is managed under the banner of Vijayam Educational Trust and has academic collaborations with reputed institutions like IIT Bombay, TCS-iON, and Oracle Academy.

== CIMAGE Group Of Institutions ==
The Colleges listed below are the parts of ‘CIMAGE Group of Institutions’ running under ‘Vijayam Educational Trust’ :-

1. CIMAGE Professional College is affiliated to Aryabhatta Knowledge University.

2. ‘Catalyst College’ is affiliated to Patliputra University .

3. ‘Swantrata Senani Shankarlal Agrawal Prabandhan Evam Takniki Mahavidyalay’ is affiliated to Patliputra University .

In a significant milestone, CIMAGE Professional College was awarded a 'B++' Grade by NAAC in its very first accreditation cycle - marking it as the first college under Patliputra University to achieve this honor. This recognition highlights the institute's commitment to quality education and continuous improvement.

== CIMAGE and IIT Bombay ==
CIMAGE is the first and only Institution in Bihar to get the status of Super Resource Center from IIT Bombay and it is also the first and only college to start the FOSS CLUB in the state. It conducts regular workshops and training sessions in collaboration with IIT Bombay to promote open-source technologies.

This partnership has significantly enhanced the technical skillset and exposure of students across various disciplines.
