= Oriental College, Patna City =

Degree college in Bihar, India

Oriental College
- ओरिएंटल महाविद्यालय
- Established: 1964; 62 years ago
- Academic affiliations: Patliputra University; Bihar School Examination Board
- Principal: Syed Eqbal Afzai
- Students: 4627
- Location: Gujari Bazar, Sadikpur, Patna City, Bihar, 800008
- Campus: Urban 1.41 acres (5058.7Sq. Mts)
- Accreditation: NAAC Grade C
- Website: orientalcollege.in

Oriental College is a minority degree college in Patna City, Bihar, India. It is affiliated with Patliputra University. College offers Senior secondary education, Undergraduate degree in Arts, Science, Commerce and conducts some vocational courses.

== History ==
The college was established on 21 April 1964 with a goal of providing higher education on par with standard. It is a parent body of the Mohammadan Education Committee, Patna, which was founded in 1882.

== Degrees and courses ==
College offers the following degrees and courses.

- Senior secondary
  - Intermediate of Arts
  - Intermediate of Commerce
  - Intermediate of Science

The college is affiliated to Bihar School Examination Board for its Intermediate courses.

- Bachelor's degree
  - Bachelor of Arts
  - Bachelor of Science
  - Bachelor of Commerce

== Facilities for student ==
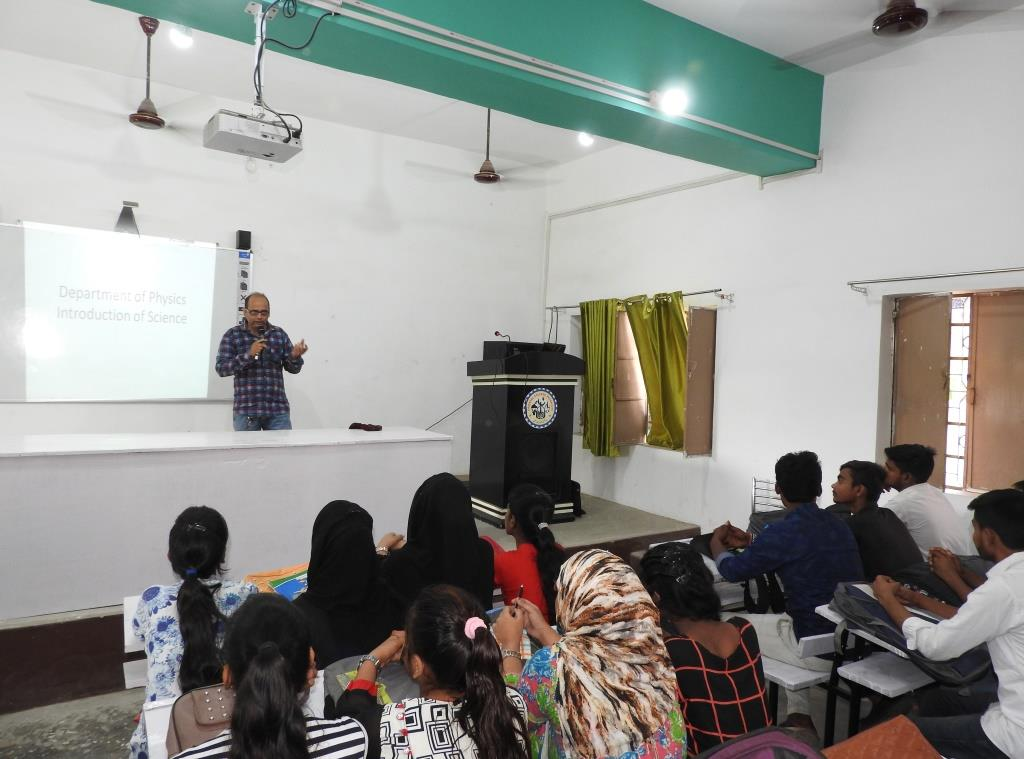
Student of physics department in smart class

- Smart Class
- ICT Lab
- Web OPAC (www.ocpclib.org)
- INFLIBNET
- Library Automated with Smart Class
- Boys / Girls Common Room
- Science Lab & Arts lab
- Rainwater Harvesting
- Gymnasium
- Indoor & Outdoor Games
- Cycle / Two Wheeler Parking
- Partially Automated and Computerized Office
- Two Smart Class
- NCC
- NSS
- Medical-Cum-Retiring Room
