= Development Management Institute =

Business school in Patna, Bihar, India

- Type: Education Institute
- Established: 2014
- Chairman: RJM Pillai
- Director: Prof Debiprasad Mishra
- Location: Patna, Bihar, India; 25.6121°N 85.0980°E
- Campus: Urban
- Website: https://www.dmi.ac.in/
- Location within Patna

The Development Management Institute is an educational institute in Patna, Bihar, India. It was established in 2014 with the active support of the Rural Development Department, Government of Bihar.

Development Management Institute offers a two-year post-graduate diploma in Development Management.

Its programme is accredited by the All India Council for Technical Education.

== History ==
Development Management Institute was set up13 February 2014 pursuant to a desire and decision of the Government of Bihar to establish a High Performing Knowledge Institution patterned on the vision with which the Institute of Rural Management Anand (IRMA) was established in 1979. Nitish Kumar, chief minister of Bihar, in a meeting attended by core committee members, directed officials concerned to complete recruitment of faculty for the institute by March 2014, so that the academic work could begin from the coming academic session July–August 2014. The first class commenced their studies in June 2014. A 15-acre campus is being built in Bihta.

== Courses offered ==
Development Management Institute conducts regular two-year diploma program in development management. Its management programmes are accredited by All India Council for Technical Education. Admission to the post-graduate programme is done through Common Admission Test. Many management events, competitions, and workshops are organised by various committees throughout the year. The curriculum primarily focuses on imparting competencies necessary for participatory governance and management of resources, enterprises, institutions and interventions. The programme design consists of mutually reinforcing classroom and experiential learning interspersed at regular intervals.

== Associate organisations ==
Development Management Institute was set up in 2014 with the support of the Rural Development Department, Government of Bihar and several prominent development support agencies (the Bihar Rural Livelihood Promotion Society and the Bihar State Milk Co-Operative Federation).
