= Sri Krishna Medical College and Hospital =

Government medical college and hospital in Bihar, India

- Type: Government
- Established: 11 May 1970; 56 years ago
- Affiliations: Bihar University of Health Sciences
- Principal: Dr. Kumari Bibha
- Location: Muzaffarpur, Bihar, India; 26°7′43″N 85°22′14″E
- Campus: Urban
- Website: www.skmedicalcollege.org

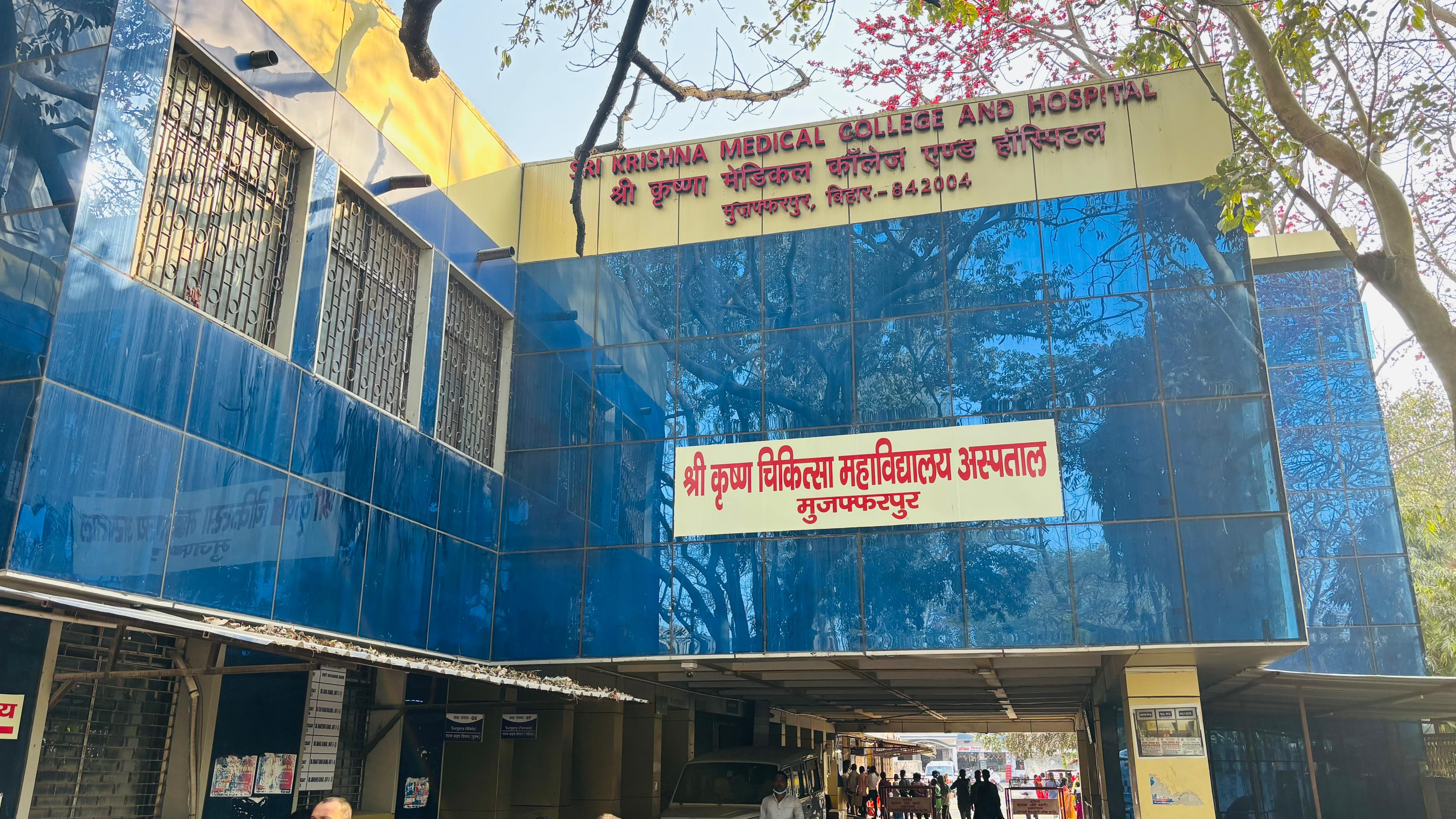
Sri Krishna Medical College and Hospital

Sri Krishna Medical College and Hospital (abbreviated as SKMCH) is a government medical college and tertiary care teaching hospital located in Muzaffarpur, Bihar, India. Established in 1970, it is one of the oldest medical institutions in Bihar and serves as a major referral centre for North Bihar. The institution provides undergraduate and postgraduate medical education and offers specialized medical care across multiple departments.

== History ==
In March 1970, a society named Vaishali Shiksha Pratisthan was registered with the objective to promote, encourage, and spread professional, technical, and general education in Bihar. The college admitted its first batch for the session 1969–70, and teaching initially took place in the S.K.J. Law College building at Ganipur, Muzaffarpur. Dr. S.M. Nawab was appointed as the founding principal.

During the same period, 170 acres of land were acquired at the east side of Muzaffarpur–Sitamarhi road, 2 km from Zero Mile, and the campus was named Umanagar. The college was shifted to its own building in January 1973. By 1975, the campus had four boys' hostels (capacity 400), a separate girls' hostel, principal's quarters, 18-room guest house, bank, post office, and a college building covering 1,70,000 sq. ft. with two lecture theatres.

The first MCI inspection occurred in 1975, followed by a second in 1977. The MBBS program was recognized on the first attempt. Finally, the college was taken over by the Government of Bihar on 1 October 1979.

== Hospital ==
The Sri Krishna Medical College Hospital is a tertiary care teaching hospital attached to the college, providing advanced medical services to North Bihar. It includes:

- Outpatient and inpatient care across multiple specialties
- Emergency services and trauma care
- Intensive Care Units (ICU), Pediatric ICU (PICU), Neonatal ICU (NICU)
- Super-specialty departments such as Cardiology, Neurosurgery, Plastic Surgery, Pediatric Surgery, and Respiratory Medicine.
- Diagnostic laboratories including Radiology, Pathology, Microbiology, and other specialized testing.

Hospital Statistics
| Parameter | Details |
|---|---|
| Total Doctors | 350+ |
| Total Departments | 50+ |
| Total Beds | 1000+ |
| ICU Beds | 200+ |
| PICU/NICU Beds | Included in ICU count |
| OPD Clinics | 5+ |
| Laboratories | 20+ |

== Homi Bhabha Cancer Hospital and Research Centre ==
The Homi Bhabha Cancer Hospital and Research Centre, Muzaffarpur is located within the SKMCH campus. It is operated under the Tata Memorial Centre and the Department of Atomic Energy, Government of India and provides specialized cancer care and research facilities.

== Campus ==
The SKMCH campus is located in Umanagar, Muzaffarpur, along the Muzaffarpur–Sitamarhi road, approximately 2 km from Zero Mile. The campus spans around 170 acres and provides comprehensive facilities for students, faculty, and staff.

== See also ==
- Government Medical College and Hospital, Chapra
- All India Institute of Medical Sciences, Patna
- IGIMS Patna
- Homi Bhabha Cancer Hospital and Research Centre, Muzaffarpur
