= Bihar Animal Sciences University =

State agricultural university in Bihar, India

- Seal of Bihar Animal Sciences University
- Motto: ज्ञानं परमं ध्येयम्
- Motto in English: Knowledge is the supreme goal
- Type: State agricultural university
- Established: 2017 (9 years ago)
- Affiliations: UGC, ICAR
- Chancellor: Governor of Bihar
- Vice-Chancellor: Dr. Indrajeet Singh
- Location: Patna, Bihar, India
- Website: www.basu.org.in

Bihar Animal Sciences University (BASU) is a state agricultural university located at Patna, Bihar, India. It has jurisdiction over the field of veterinary and animal sciences in Bihar.

== History ==
The formal proposal for establishing an animal sciences university in Bihar was made as part of the "Bihar Agricultural Road Map 2012–2017", the second agriculture road map for Bihar, which was launched by the then President of India Pranab Mukherjee in October 2012. The roadmap set it as one of its targets that "A new University for Animal Husbadry [sic], Dairy and Fisheries shall be set up in the state." However, no specific budget was set aside for setting the university, and the budget was to come out of the general animal husbandry budget.

The university was established in 2016 through the Bihar Animal Sciences University Act, 2016, which was passed as a Bill in August 2016 and notified later that month. The university was formed by transferring two colleges, Bihar Veterinary College and Sanjay Gandhi Institute of Dairy Technology, from Bihar Agricultural University, as well as six other institutes transferred from Bihar Agricultural University and Rajendra Agricultural University. An additional college, the College of Fisheries, Kishanganj, was also to be established. The college was officially approved two years later, in May 2018 and established in August 2018. The university became operational in June 2017 with the appointment of its first Vice-Chancellor, Rameshwar Singh, one of four state universities and six private universities established in Bihar in 2017–2018.

== Academics ==
The university offers undergraduate, postgraduate, doctoral and diploma degrees in three fields, veterinary science & animal husbandry, dairy technology, and fisheries management.

== Constituent colleges and institutes ==
The university has three constituent colleges:

- Bihar Veterinary College
- College of Fisheries, Kishanganj
- Bihar Institute of Dairy Technology

It runs six other institutes:

- Central Poultry Farm, Patna
- Exotic Cattle Breeding Farm, Patna
- Government Buffalo Farm, Sipaya (Gopalganj)
- Government Cattle Farm, Gaya
- Government Goat Breeding Farm, Purnia
- Institute of Animal Health and Production, Patna

== See also ==
- List of agricultural universities in India
- List of institutions of higher education in Bihar
