= Indira Gandhi Institute of Medical Sciences =

Hospital in India

- Other name: IGIMS Patna
- Motto: प्राणिनाम् आर्तिनाशनम्
- Motto in English: The destruction of the suffering of all living beings
- Type: State medical university & hospital
- Established: 1983; 43 years ago
- Academic affiliations: NMC, UGC, AIU
- Budget: ₹340.34 crore (US$35 million) (FY 2020)
- Director: Dr. Bindey Kumar
- Location: Sheikhpura, Patna, Bihar, 800014, India; 25°36′39″N 85°05′20″E
- Campus: 132 acres (53 ha); Urban
- Sporting affiliations: IGIMS Premier League, ISL
- Website: igims.org
- Government of Bihar

Organisation
- Type: Institute under State Legislature Act

Services
- Standards: NMC
- Emergency department: Level I Trauma Center
- Beds: 1,055

Helipads
- Helipad: No

Indira Gandhi Institute of Medical Sciences is a public medical college and hospital located in Bihar, Patna, India. An Institute under State Legislature Act, it was established in 1983 as an autonomous organisation on the pattern of AIIMS New Delhi. It is one of the main health care institutions in the state of Bihar.

It is the only superspecialist institute of Bihar and tops the hierarchy in patient referral chain. The institute provides education in medicine and does conducts many health and medicinal research in Bihar. It received affiliation of medical college from MCI (now NMC) in September 2011. It has 150 recognised MBBS seats and the highest number of superspeciality seats among the colleges of Bihar. It is recognised to provide degree of MBBS, MD, MS, MCh, DM, DNB, PhD and various paramedical degrees.

== Campus ==
IGIMS is located on Bailey Road. The whole medical college and hospital campus is spread over an area of 131 acres. The hospital is proposed to have 3000 beds in the coming few years. At present, there are nearly 1070 beds present with a 100-bed Regional Cancer Institute. Construction is ongoing of another 500-bed ultra modern hospital, and 200-bed Regional Institute of Ophthalmology.

== Departments ==
IGIMS provides the following clinical departments:

- Anaesthesia
- Endocrinology
- Cardiology
- Cardiothoracic and Vascular Surgery
- Community Medicine
- Dentistry
- Ear, Nose & Throat (ENT)
- Gastroenterology
- GI Surgery
- Internal Medicine
- Nephrology
- Neurosurgery
- Neurology
- Nuclear Medicine
- Orthopedics
- Paediatric
- Physical Medicine and Rehabilitation
- Psychiatry
- Pulmonology
- Reproductive Biology
- Regional Cancer Center
- Regional Institute of Ophthalmology (RIO)
- Skin (Dermatology)
- Urology
- Trauma and Casualty
- General Surgery
- Pediatric Surgery

== See also ==
- Government Medical College and Hospital, Chapra
- Sri Krishna Medical College and Hospital
- Lord Buddha Koshi Medical College and Hospital
