= Bihar University of Health Sciences =

Public medical university in Bihar, India

Coordinates: 25.592382°N 85.134976°E

- बिहार स्वास्थ्य विज्ञान विश्वविद्यालय
- Official seal of BUHS
- Other name: BUHS Patna
- Motto: Swasthyam Sarvārtha-Sādhanam (Sanskrit)
- Motto in English: Health is the means to all achievements
- Type: Public Medical University
- Established: 1 July 2022; 4 years ago
- Affiliations: UGC; AIU
- Chancellor: Chief Minister of Bihar
- Vice-Chancellor: Dr. Bindey Kumar (acting)
- Location: Patna, Bihar, India
- Campus: Urban
- Language: English; Hindi
- Colors: Purple & Blue
- Website: buhs.ac.in

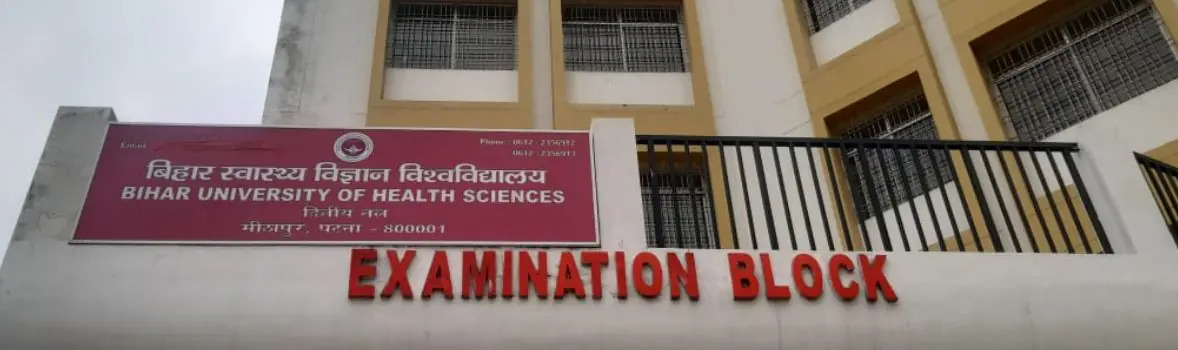
Bihar University of Health Sciences, Patna

Bihar University of Health Sciences (abbreviated as BUHS) is a Public medical university in Patna established on 1 July 2022 by the Government of Bihar through the enactment of The Bihar University of Health Sciences Act 2021 (Bihar Act No. 19 of 2021) to affiliate all the existing health science colleges and institutions, set up by the Government and/or Trust or Society, which were earlier affiliated to conventional universities in Bihar with a purpose of ensuring proper, systematic and uniform instruction, teaching, training and research in modern and Indians systems of medicine.

== Administration ==
=== Governance ===
The Chief Minister of Bihar Mr. Samrat Choudhary is the chancellor of the BUHS. This university became active with the appointment of Dr. Surendra Nath Sinha as the first vice-chancellor of BUHS.

=== Affiliations ===
The Bihar University of Health Science is an affiliating university and has jurisdiction over all the medical, nursing, and paramedical colleges of the entire state of Bihar. The BUHS is currently operating from the office of AKU.

=== Table legend ===
Key:

- ‡ Some of the listed subjects may not be offered by all colleges
- ₴ Some colleges offer either DM or MCh and some both.
- ‡‡ Some courses may be offered by a single college only.

Name in table	Course	Type	Subjects Offered For Specialisation ‡
MBBS	Bachelor of Medicine, Bachelor of Surgery	Baccalaureate	None
PDM	Diploma	Postgraduate diploma	Anaesthesiology, Clinical Pathology, Dermatology and Venerology, Obstetrics and Gynaecology, Ophthalmology, Orthopaedics, Oto-Rhino Laryngology, Child Health, Physical Medicine and Rehabilitation, Psychological Medicine, Public Health, Radiodiagnosis, Medical Radiotherapy, TB and Chest Diseases
MS	Master of Surgery	Master's degree	General Surgery, Oto-Rhino Laryngology, Ophthalmology, Orthopaedics, Obstetrics and Gynaecology
MD	Master of Medicine	Master's degree	Anaesthesiology, Anatomy, Biochemistry, Community Medicine, Dermatology Venerology and Leprosy, General Medicine, Microbiology, Paediatrics, Pharmacology, Physical Medicine & Rehabilitation, Psychiatry, Radiodiagnosis, Radiotherapy, Respiratory Medicine, Transfusion medicine & Immunohaematology
DM	Doctor of Medicine or M.Ch ₴	Doctoral degree	Cardiology, Medical Gastro-enterology, Nephrology, Neurology, Pulmonology
BDS	Bachelor of Dental Surgery	Baccalaureate	None
MDS	Master of Dental Surgery	Master's degree	Conservative Dentistry and Endodontics, Prosthodontics and Crown & Bridge, Periodontology, Oral and Maxillofacial Surgery, Orthodontics and Dentofacial Orthopedics, Oral Pathology and Microbiology, Pedodontics and Preventive Dentistry, Oral Medicine and Radiology, Public HealthDentistry
BAMS	Bachelor of Ayurvedic Medicine and Surgery	Baccalaureate	None
BNA	B.Sc Nursing in Ayurvedic Medicine	Baccalaureate	None
BPA	Bachelor of Pharmacy in Ayurvedic Medicine	Baccalaureate	None
BHMS	Bachelor of Homeopathic Medicine and Surgery	Baccalaureate	None
MDH	Doctor of Medicine in Homoeopathy	Master's degree	Materia Medica, Homoeopathic Philosophy, Repertory
BPharm	Bachelor of Pharmacy	Baccalaureate	None
MPharm	Master of Pharmacy	Master's degree	Pharmaceutical Analysis, Pharmaceutical Chemistry, Pharmacognosy and Phytochemistry, Pharmaceutics, Pharmacology, Pharmacy practice
Pharm D	Doctor of pharmacy (Post BPharm)	Doctoral degree	None
Pharm D	Doctor of pharmacy	Doctoral degree	None
BSN	B.Sc Nursing	Baccalaureate	None
PBSN	PostB.Sc Nursing	Postgraduate education	None
MSN	Master of Science in Nursing	Master's degree	Medical Surgical Nursing (Includes Sub specialties), Obstetrics and Gynaecological Nursing, Child Health (Paediatric) Nursing, Mental Health (Psychiatric) Nursing, Community Health Nursing
BASLP	Bachelor of Audiology and Speech language pathology	Baccalaureate	None
BPT	Bachelor of Physiotherapy	Baccalaureate	None
BMLT	B.Scin Medical laboratory technology	Baccalaureate	None
MPT	Master of Science in Physiotherapy	Master's degree	Musculo-skeletal and Sports, Physiotherapy in Neurology, Physiotherapy in Cardio - Respiratory, Physiotherapy in Pediatrics
Others‡‡			

==== Government College ====
College Name	BCVT	BDS	BPharm	BMLT	BSN	BSO	DM	MBBS	MD	MDS	MPharm	MS	MSMP	MSN	PBSN	PDM	Others
Patna Medical College, Patna	No	No	No	Yes	Yes	No	Yes	Yes	Yes	No	No	Yes	No	Yes	Yes	Yes	PG Diploma/DNB and other paramedical courses
Nalanda Medical College, Patna	No	No	No	No	Yes	No	No	Yes	Yes	No	No	Yes	No	No	No	Yes	PG Diploma/DNB
Darbhanga Medical College, Laheriasarai	No	No	No	No	Yes	No	No	Yes	Yes	No	No	Yes	No	No	Yes	Yes	PG Diploma/DNB and paramedical courses
JLNMCH, Bhagalpur	No	No	No	No	Yes	No	No	Yes	Yes	No	No	Yes	No	No	Yes	Yes	Paramedical courses
ANMMCH, Gaya	No	No	No	No	Yes	No	No	Yes	Yes	No	No	Yes	No	No	Yes	Yes	Paramedical courses
SKMCH, Muzaffarpur	No	No	No	No	Yes	No	No	Yes	Yes	No	No	Yes	No	No	No	Yes	PG Diploma/DNB
BMIMS, Pawapuri	No	No	No	No	Yes	No	No	Yes	Yes	No	No	Yes	No	No	Yes	Yes	Paramedical courses
JNKTMCH, Madhepura	No	No	No	No	Yes	No	No	Yes	Yes	No	No	Yes	No	No	No	Yes	PG Diploma/DNB
GMC, Bettiah	No	No	No	No	Yes	No	No	Yes	Yes	No	No	Yes	No	No	No	Yes	PG Diploma/DNB
GMC, Purnea	No	No	No	No	Yes	No	No	Yes	Yes	No	No	Yes	No	No	No	Yes	PG Diploma/DNB
ESIC Medical College, Bihta	No	No	No	No	Yes	No	No	Yes	No	No	No	No	No	No	No	No	No

==== Private Medical College ====
College Name	BCVT	BDS	BPharm	BMLT	BSN	BSO	DM	MBBS	MD	MDS	MPharm	MS	MSMP	MSN	PBSN	PDM	Others
Lord Buddha Koshi Medical College, Saharsa	No	Yes	Yes	Yes	No	No	No	Yes	Yes	No	No	Yes	No	No	No	No	PG Diploma/DNB
Madhubani Medical College, Madhubani	No	No	No	No	No	No	No	Yes	Yes	No	No	Yes	No	No	No	No	PG Diploma/DNB
Radha Devi Jageshwari Memorial Medical College & Hospital	No	No	No	No	No	No	No	Yes	Yes	No	No	Yes	No	No	No	No	PG Diploma/DNB
Netaji Subhas Medical College & Hospital, Bihta	No	No	No	No	No	No	No	Yes	Yes	No	No	Yes	No	No	No	No	PG Diploma/DNB
Shree Narayan Medical Institute & Hospital, Saharsa	No	No	No	No	No	No	No	Yes	Yes	No	No	Yes	No	No	No	No	PG Diploma/DNB

== Government Medical Colleges (Allopathy) ==
S.No	College name	Location	District	Established year	No. of Seats(MBBS)	Stream
01	Patna Medical College and Hospital	Patna	Patna district	1925	250	Allopathy
02	Darbhanga Medical College and Hospital	Darbhanga	Darbhanga district	1946	150	Allopathy
03	Anugrah Narayan Magadh Medical College and Hospital	Gaya	Gaya district	1969	120	Allopathy
04	Nalanda Medical College and Hospital	Patna	Patna district	1970	200	Allopathy
05	Sri Krishna Medical College and Hospital	Muzaffarpur	Muzaffarpur district	1970	150	Allopathy
06	Jawaharlal Nehru Medical College, Bhagalpur	Bhagalpur	Bhagalpur district	1971	150	Allopathy
07	Government Medical College, Bettiah	Bettiah	West Champaran district	2013	120	Allopathy
08	Bhagwan Mahavir Institute of Medical Sciences	Pawapuri	Nalanda district	2013	120	Allopathy
09	Jannayak Karpoori Thakur Medical College and Hospital, Madhepura	Madhepura	Madhepura district	2020	100	Allopathy
10	ESIC Medical College and Hospital, Patna	Bihta	Patna district	2021	100	Allopathy
11	Government Medical College and Hospital, Purnea	Purnea	Purnea district	2023	100	Allopathy
12	Shri Ram Janki Medical College and Hospital, Samastipur	Sarairanjan	Samastipur district	2024	50	Allopathy
13	Government Medical College and Hospital, Chapra	Chapra	Saran district	2025	50	Allopathy

== Private Medical Colleges (Allopathy) ==
S.No	College name	Location	District	Established year	No. of Seats(MBBS)	Stream
01	Lord Buddha Koshi Medical College and Hospital Saharsa	Saharsa district	2012	250	Allopathy	
02	Madhubani Medical College and Hospital	Madhubani	Madhubani district	2018	250	Allopathy
03	Netaji Subhas Medical College and Hospital	Bihta	Patna district	2020	250	Allopathy
04	Radha Devi Jageshwari Memorial Medical College and Hospital	Muzaffarpur	Muzaffarpur district	2021	200	Allopathy
05	Shree Narayan Medical Institute and Hospital	Saharsa	Saharsa district	2021	150	Allopathy

== Nursing Colleges ==
S.No	College name	Location	District	Established year	No. of Seats(B.Sc Nursing)	Type
01	AHS Nursing College & Hospital	Samastipur	Samastipur district	2023	60	Private
02	Alay Fatima Hai College of Nursing	Patna	Patna district	2023	60	Private

== Pharmacy Colleges ==
S.No	College name	Location	District	Established year	No. of Seats(B. Pharma)	Type
01	Government Pharmacy Institute, Patna	Patna	Patna district	1958	100	Government
02	Chanakya College of Pharmacy and Medical Sciences, Bhojpur	Chanakya Nagar	Bhojpur	2008	100	Private

== Affiliated colleges ==
- Affiliated colleges under Bihar University of Health Sciences
