= Maulana Mazharul Haque Arabic and Persian University =

Public university in Patna, Bihar, India

Coordinates: 25.593633°N 85.105383°E

- Motto: طلب العلم فرضیۃ علیٰ کل الانسان (Arabic: "The seeking of Knowledge is necessary")
- Type: Public
- Established: 1992 (34 years ago)
- Affiliations: UGC
- Chancellor: Governor of Bihar
- Vice-Chancellor: Dr. Mohammad Alamgeer
- Students: 21,000 (including Alim and Fazil students registered with the University)
- Location: Patna, Bihar, India
- Campus: 6.5 acres (2.6 ha); Urban
- Website: mmhapu.ac.in

Maulana Mazharul Haque Arabic and Persian University (MMHAPU) is a state university in Patna, Bihar, India. The university was established under the provisions of the Bihar State Universities Act of 1976, which took effect on 10 April 1998.

MMHAPU is a member of the Association of Indian Universities, New Delhi as of December 2009. Although three Vice-Chancellors were appointed by the Government of Bihar between 1998 and 2008, the university did not begin admitting students until 2007. The University started its first academic session in July 2008.

The university has more than 100 Knowledge Resource Centres. At present, the school has 21 affiliated colleges, including thirtyB.Ed. College. It offers PG Semester System courses in English, Urdu, Persian, journalism, mass communication, and education.

The university has had two convocations, in 2012 and 2015. It is named after veteran freedom fighter Maulana Mazharul Haque.

== Affiliated institutions ==
- Fatima Degree College, Phulwari Sharif
- Shams Teachers Training College, West Champaran
- Royal Heritage College of Education, Hajipur
- Nazirul Hasan Teacher’s Training Collelge, Khagaria
- Sai College of Education, Jehanabad
- Chandragupta Maurya College of Education, Patna
- Maxford Teacher’s Training College, Patna
- Padum Lal Rupan Singh B.Ed. & D.El.Ed. College, Aurangabad
- Baidyanath College of Education, Nawada

== Departments ==
- Department of Arabic
- Department of Persian
- Department of Urdu
- Department of Islamic Studies
- Department of English
- Department of Management
- Department of Journalism and Mass Communication
- Department of Education
