= Bihar Agricultural University =

Public agricultural university in Bhagalpur, Bihar, India

Coordinates: 25.2386°N 87.0509°E

- Established: 17 August 1908 (117 years ago)
- Affiliations: UGC, ICAR
- Chancellor: Governor of Bihar
- Vice-Chancellor: Dr. D. R. Singh
- Location: Bhagalpur, Bihar, India
- Website: www.bausabour.ac.in

Bihar Agricultural University is an autonomous public state university in Bhagalpur, Bihar, India. It was established in 1908 as Bengal Provincial Agricultural College by Andrew Henderson Leith Fraser and was later renamed as Bihar Agricultural College following the partition of Bengal. It was placed under the Indian Council of Agricultural Research (ICAR) in 2010 and is the oldest agricultural institute of the state.

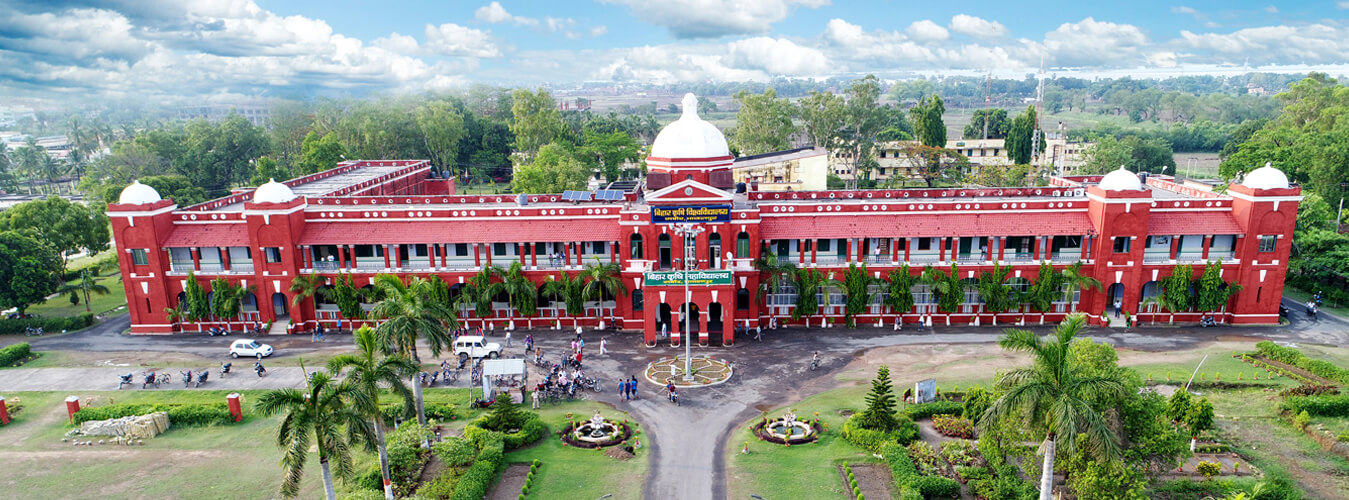
Bihar Agriculture college, Bhagalpur

== Agriculture Knowledge Dissemination System ==
Bihar Agriculture University is engaged in Research and Extension activities in the field of agriculture. In order to extend the research done in the university to farmers of Bihar, it signed an agreement with World Development Foundation, New Delhi to implement a project of "Agriculture Knowledge Dissemination System". The project basically involved educating the farmers using ICT and video conferencing system for improved agriculture and livestock production.

== Colleges ==
The university has ten colleges:

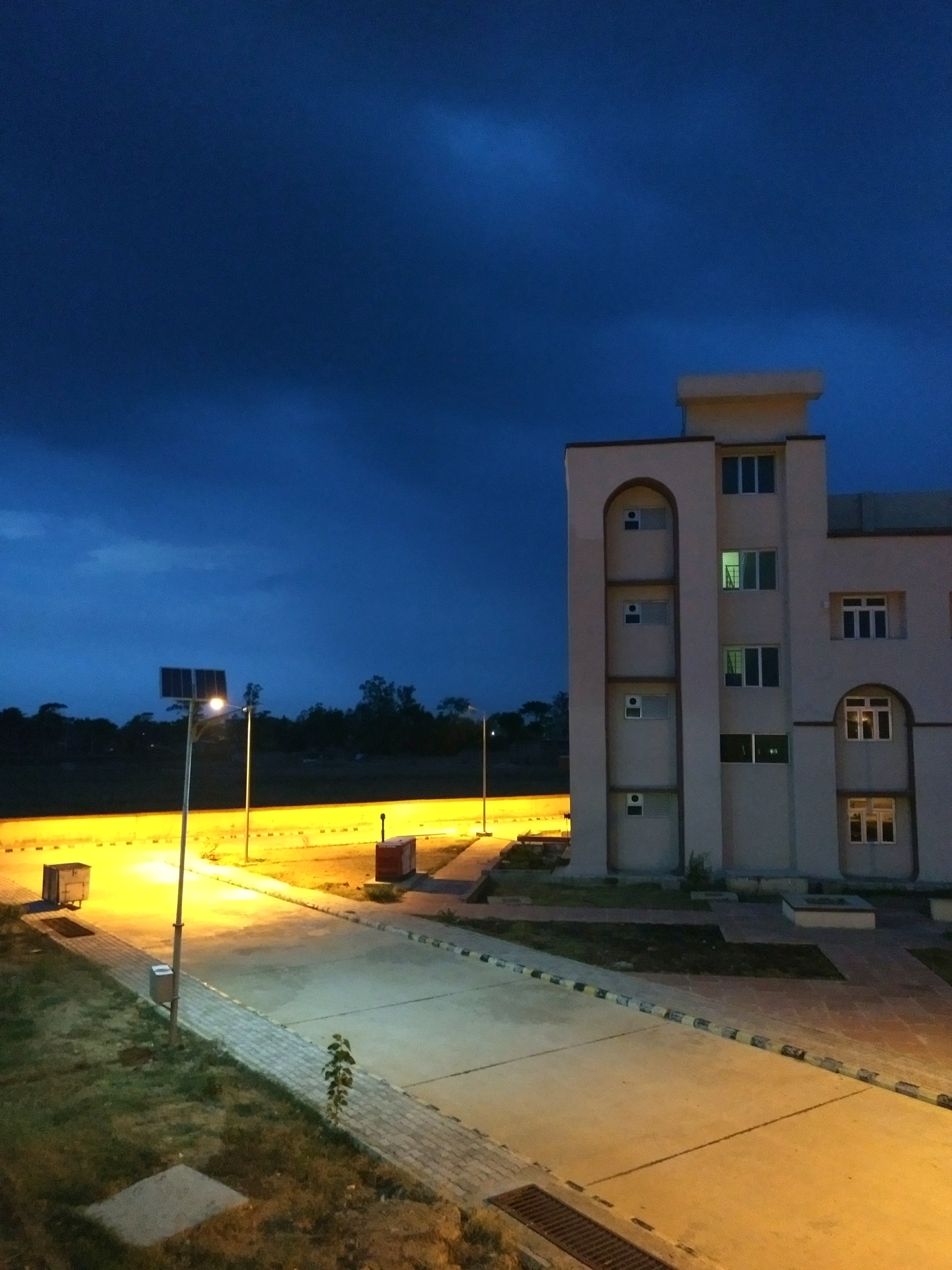
vks college of Agriculture Dumraon

Name	District	Established
Bihar agriculture college, Sabour	Bhagalpur district	1908
Bhola Paswan Shastri Agricultural College	Purnia District	2011
Mandan Bharti Agriculture College, Agwanpur	Saharsa district	2007
Nalanda College of Horticulture, Noorsarai	Nalanda District	2006
Dr Kalam Agricultural College	Kishanganj District	2015
VKS College of Agriculture, Dumraon	Buxar District	2011
Munger Forestry College|Bihar Forestry College and Research Institute, Munger	Munger District	2022
Agriculture Business Management college	Patna District	2021
College of Agricultural Engineering, Ara	Bhojpur District	2021
College of Agricultural Biotechnology, Sabour	Bhagalpur District	2021
