= All India Institute of Medical Sciences, Patna =

Medical college and research institute in India

- Motto: sarve santu nirāmayāḥ (Sanskrit)
- Motto in English: Let all be healthy
- Type: Public medical school
- Established: 16 July 2012; 14 years ago
- President: Dr. Radha Krishan Dhiman
- Director: Brig. (Dr.) Raju Agarwal
- Academic staff: 229 (2024)
- Students: 671 (2022)
- Undergraduates: 538 (2022)
- Postgraduates: 133 (2022)
- Location: Patna, Bihar, India; 25°33′46.45″N 85°2′20.92″E
- Campus: 134 acres (54 ha); Urban
- Website: AIIMS Patna
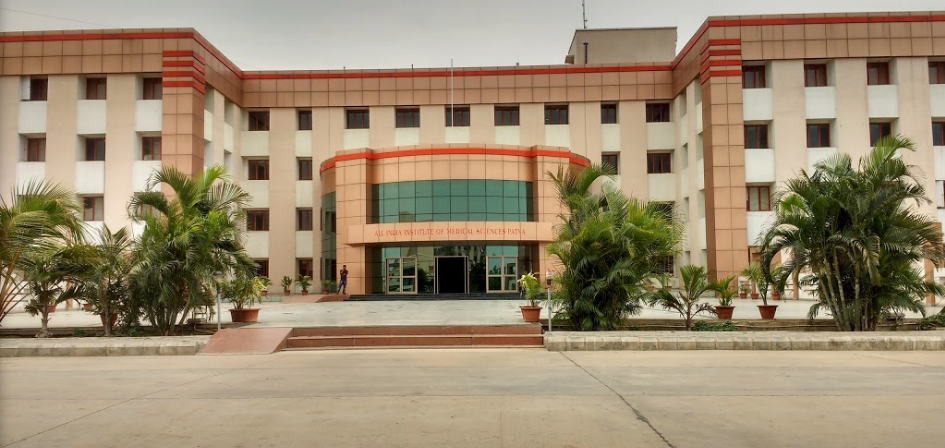

All India Institute of Medical Sciences Patna (AIIMS Patna), previously Jaya Prakash Narayan All India Institute of Medical Sciences (JPNAIIMS), is a medical college and medical research public institute located in Phulwari Sharif, Patna, Bihar, India. It is one of the Institutes of National Importance in India. It started operating on 16 July 2012 after a series of observations by the Patna High Court. The institute operates autonomously under the Ministry of Health and Family Welfare. Its foundation was laid by Bhairon Singh Shekhawat on 3 January 2004, during his tenure as vice-president. As of 2018, it became fully functional.

== History ==
In 2004, the central government decided to set up new AIIMS at Rishikesh, Bhopal, Patna, Jodhpur, Bhubaneswar and Raipur. Though the foundation stone for the ₹ 350-crore project (2004 estimate) was laid in 2004 during Atal Bihari Vajpayee's tenure, the project was delayed owing to the power shift at the centre, and its cost escalated from ₹3.35 billion (US$36 million) to ₹8.5 billion (US$91 million). As of 2015, AIIMS Patna had been under construction for more than eight years.

The official state of AIIMS Patna was set through an ordinance, which allowed six AIIMS—like institutes to become operational from September 2012. This was replaced by the All-India Institute of Medical Sciences (Amendment) Bill, 2012, which was passed in the Lok Sabha in August of that year and in the Rajya Sabha in September.

AIIMS-P doubled the intake of students into its MBBS course to 100 in 2013 from 50 in 2012. In May 2018, a blood bank and eight new departments were inaugurated. In August 2018, an emergency and trauma centre, eight modular operation theatres and an additional 250 beds at the inpatient department (IPD) were inaugurated. AIIMS Patna drone will now fly at a speed of 120 km, has the ability to send medicines up to a radius of 200 km in case of disaster and flood.

== Location ==
AIIMS Patna is located in Patna (on NH-139), near Walmi institute at Phulwari Sharif. It is spread over 134 acres, comprising the main medical college campus on 100 acres and residential campus on 34 acres.

== Hospital ==
AIIMS Patna hospital comprises OPD block, IPD block, Trauma and Emergency block and a separate AYUSH and PMR building having state of art infrastructure. As of 2023, AIIMS Patna has 1331 beds, 28 functional modular operating theatres, 12 functional super speciality and 18 functional speciality. AIIMS Patna has a 30,000-kilo litre capacity oxygen tank installed at its premises.

== Academics ==
AIIMS Patna started its operations on 25 September 2012. AIIMS New Delhi, has been mentoring the two new AIIMS in Patna and Bhubaneswar, PGI Chandigarh has been mentoring AIIMS coming up in Rishikesh and Jodhpur, while JIPMER Puducherry has been overseeing the AIIMS in Bhopal and Raipur.

Medical college comprises various pre-clinical, para-clinical and clinical departments. Each department has its own seminar rooms and well-equipped labs. There are four lecture theatres in the college building, all of them are equipped with centralised air conditioning, projectors, and many other facilities. It also comprises e-class rooms for conducting various seminars. The batch of 2012 started at AIIMS Patna on 25 September 2012, with 50 medical students admitted to the institute. To start with, AIIMS Patna imparted training in four subjects to the first MBBS students– anatomy, physiology, biochemistry, and community medicine.

17 super speciality areas including cardiology, cardiothoracic vascular surgery, neurology, neurosurgery, psychiatry, gastroenterology, nephrology (with dialysis), endocrinology and nuclear medicine have already been set up under the Pradhan Mantri Swasthya Suraksha Yojana in AIIMS Patna.

== Rankings ==
University rankings

General – India
- NIRF (Overall) (2024): 99

Medical – India
- NIRF (2024): 26

The National Institutional Ranking Framework (NIRF) ranked it 26th among Medical colleges in India and 99th overall in 2024. It is ranked 20th as per India Today 2024 Medical rankings.

== Hostels ==
AIIMS is a residential university. AIIMS Patna has hostels for all the undergraduates, postgraduates students but not for senior residents.

== Patna High Court's directives on AIIMS Patna ==
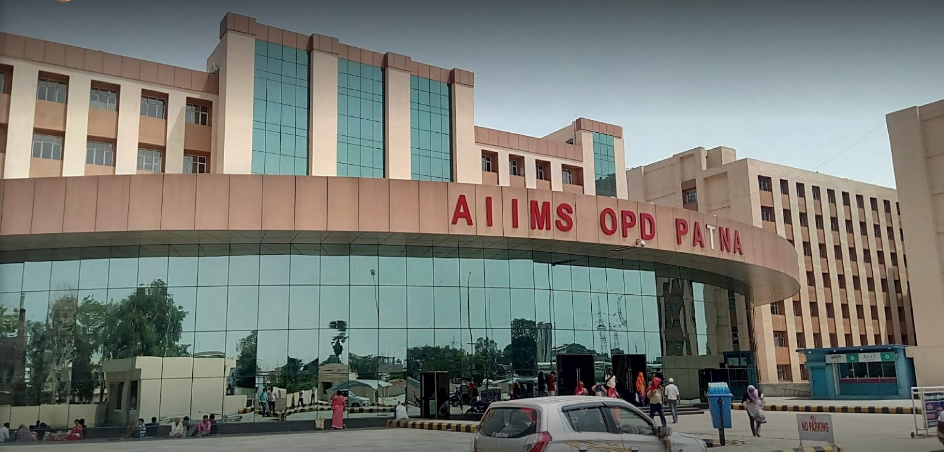
AIIMS Patna OPD

In April 2012, the Patna High Court constituted a three-member core committee comprising representatives from the centre, the state and the AIIMS to speed up construction work of the super-specialty hospital.

Shashi Bhushan, the financial advisor to AIIMS Patna had said: "The medical college is expected to start functioning from July this year for which appointment of professors is on," but now the college will start in September 2012 and hospital by 2013. AIIMS Patna would be governed by the AIIMS Act until the Union government made a separate law for the upcoming hospital. The Patna high court on 18 July issued a directive that the doctors of trauma and emergency wards of the All India Institute of Medical Sciences, Patna (AIIMS Patna) join at Guru Gobind Singh Hospital, Patna City, by 25 July 2012. The court also directed the Union government to ensure that doctors of seven super speciality departments of AIIMS Patna are appointed and join their duty by 25 August. These departments include gastroenterology, cardiology, nephrology, pathology and radiology. Patna high court on 1 August 2012 ordered notional deputation of the Patna DM Sanjay Kumar Singh to the upcoming hospital as its deputy director/joint director/director of AIIMS Patna, until the central government sends a deputy director or joint director or director to take this responsibility. The DM will now on oversee the affairs related to the AIIMS Patna and its development as a super speciality hospital. Bihar government had released a cheque for ₹ 53.4 million to the Guru Gobind Singh Hospital at Patna City for development of infrastructure for the emergency ward and trauma centre of AIIMS Patna. The Patna High court directed the DM on 31 August 2012, to hold a meeting with the AIIMS Patna director and superintendent of Guru Gobind Singh Hospital (GGSH), Patna City, to set modalities of super speciality treatment at the hospital. This arrangement will continue until the AIIMS Patna is completed.Patna High Court ordered on 27 September 2012, to start round-the-clock construction of the AIIMS Patna hospital building by deploying more workers and other resources to ensure its early completion. Patna High Court on 29 January 2013 directed the Bihar government to constitute a team of auditors to audit the utilization of Rs 1.50 billion by M/s B L Kashyap and Company for the construction of the hospital building of AIIMS Patna.

== See also ==
- All India Institute of Medical Sciences
- AIIMS Darbhanga
- List of medical colleges in India
- Government Medical College and Hospital, Chapra
- Sri Krishna Medical College and Hospital
- Homi Bhabha Cancer Hospital and Research Centre, Muzaffarpur
