= Darbhanga Medical College and Hospital =

Medical college and hospital in Bihar, India

- Former name: Temple Medical School
- Type: Public
- Established: 1925; 101 years ago
- Affiliations: National Medical Commission
- Academic affiliations: Bihar University of Health Sciences
- Principal: Dr. U. C. Jha
- Academic staff: 487
- Location: Darbhanga, Mithila, Bihar, 846003
- Campus: Urban
- Website: dmc.edu.in

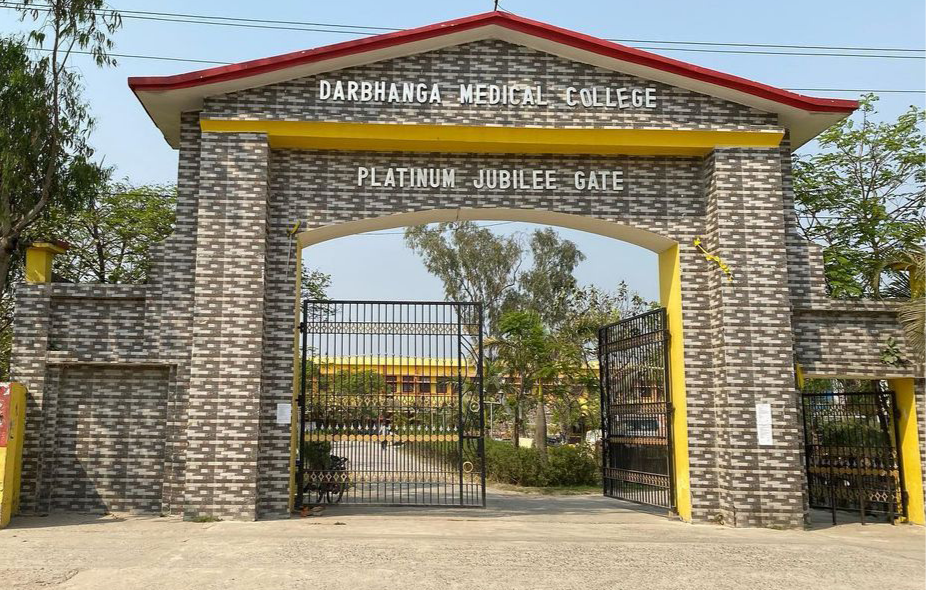
Darbhanga Medical College and Hospital

Darbhanga Medical College and Hospital (abbreviated as DMCH) is a government medical college having multiple healthcare facilities and is located in Darbhanga, Bihar. It was established in the year 1925. It is ranked 3rd in Bihar and 94th in India by IIRF 2023 ranking. College is currently affiliated with Bihar University of Health Sciences.

== History ==
The medical college was constructed through the efforts of King Rameshwar Singh of the Khandavala Dynasty who also built the beautiful Raj Nagar Palace in Madhubani. According to historical records, the Prince of Wales, later known as Edward VIII, visited Bihar in 1925. Darbhanga Maharaj Rameshwar Singh invited him to visit a medical school in Patna named ‘Temple of Medical Learning’.

The Prince, who subsequently became King Edward VIII, was very impressed by working of the medical school. On behalf of the British government, he offered to the Maharaja to upgrade the medical school into a new college for medicine.

The older, ‘Temple of Medical Learning’ was decided to be shifted somewhere else in Bihar. According to old folks, the ‘Temple of Medical Learning’, was earlier decided to be transferred to, Muzaffarpur.

The twist in the tale begin here! The maharaja accepted the relocation of the medical school but proposed establishing it in Darbhanga. Eventually, his wish was fulfilled, paving the way for the medical College in the city. The Raj family donated 300 acres of prime land in the middle of the twin cities of Darbhanga and Laheriasarai, along with Rs 6 lakh for setting up and expanding the Medical College.

Initially, the medical college was located, inside today's police hospital situated near Lohia Chowk of the city. Before a start, the king had to deposit an amount of Rs 25,000 to the British to shift the medical college. After the king, his son Kameshwar Singh upgraded and renamed the ‘Temple of Medical Learning’ to Darbhanga Medical College in 1946.

== College ==
The college offers courses including Bachelor of Medicine, Bachelor of Surgery, BSc nursing etc. The admission process is done on the basis of marks obtained in NEET examination and the regulating body is National Medical Commission (NMC) The college was earlier identified by the Government of India as a site for constructing an AIIMS .

== Hospital ==
The college provides major healthcare facilities for the people. College campus is divided among several buildings including a two-story Outdoor where thousands of patients visits daily. This is the only public healthcare institution centered in Darbhanga benefiting the people from Madhubani, Saharsa, Supaul, Samastipur and all other neighbouring districts.

== See also ==
- Education in India
- Education in Bihar
- List of educational institutions in Patna
- All India Council for Technical Education
- All India Institute of Medical Sciences Patna
  - Homi Bhabha Cancer Hospital and Research Centre, Muzaffarpur
