= List of schools in Patna =

The following is a list of Schools in Patna, Bihar, India.

== List of Schools ==
Name	Established	Address	Board Affiliation	Religious Affiliation	Ref.
Annie Besant International School, Beur	2013	Mahavir Colony, Road No. 07, Beur, Anisabad, Patna, Bihar 800002	CBSE	None	
Army Public School, Danapur Cantt.	1993	Danapur Cantt	CBSE	None	
Baldwin Academy	1987	Patna bypass road, Paijawa, Patna	CBSE	None	
Birla Open Minds	2015	Jaganpura	Central Board of Secondary Education	None	
Christ Church Diocesan School, Patna, Patna	1972	Kargil Roundabout Collectorate Road	CBSE	Christianity	
DAV Public School, BSEB	1993	Bihar State Electricity Board (BSEB) Colony, New Punai chak	Central Board of Secondary Education (CBSE)	None	
DAV Public School, Khagaul	1989	Cantt. Road, Khagaul	CBSE	None	
Delhi Public School, Patna	1998	Chandmari village, near Danapur Cantonment	CBSE	None	
Don Bosco Academy	1973	Digha-Ashiana Road	Council for the Indian School Certificate Examinations (ICSE)	Christianity	
DY Patil Pushpalata Patil School	2013	Jaganpura	CBSE	None	
Gyan Niketan	1988	Ranjan Path, Gola Road, Danapur, Patna.	CBSE	None	
Kendriya Vidyalaya, Bailey Road	1986	Bailey Road	CBSE	None	
Kendriya Vidyalaya, Kankarbagh	1966	Kankarbagh	CBSE	None	
Litera Valley School	2007	Bhagwat Nagar	CBSE	None	
Loyola High School	1969	Kurji	CBSE	Roman Catholic	
Manava Bharati India International School	2018	Near AIIMS Patna, NH-98, Nawada More, Gosai Math	CBSE	None	
Notre Dame Academy	1960	Patliputra Colony	CBSE	Roman Catholic	
Patna Collegiate School	1835	Ashok Rajpath	Bihar School Examination Board (BSEB)	None	
Patna High School	1919	Gardani Bagh	BSEB		
Patna Muslim High School	1938	B.M Das Road Po Bankipur Patna Bihar	CBSE	Muslim	
Radiant International School, Patna	2002	Cantt. Road, Khagaul Road, Danapur, Patna	Central Board of Secondary Education	None	
Rajkiya Madrasa Islamia Shamsul Hoda	1912	Noori Masjid Rd, Lalbagh, Patna, Bihar 800006	BIHAR STATE MADRASA EDUCATION BOARD	Muslim	
School of Creative Learning	1997	Danapur Cantt Shivala Road, Patna	CBSE	Private	
Seth M.R. Jaipuria School, Patna	2015	Phulwari Sharif	CBSE	None	
Shri Ram Centennial School (SRCS, Patna)	2014	Bhogipur, Near Shahpur, Jaganpura, Patna, Bihar, 804453	CBSE | Affiliation details	None	
St. Dominic Savio’s High School, Patna	1982	Siksha Kendra, Nasriganj, Digha, Patna	CBSE	Christianity	
St. Joseph's Convent High School	1853	Bankipur	ICSE	Christianity	
St. Karen's Collegiate School, Bihta, Patna	1990	Bihta, Patna, Bihar 801503	CBSE	None	
St. Karen's High School	1965	Gola Road, Patna, Bihar 801503	CBSE	None	
St. Karen's Secondary School, Khagaul Road, Patna	1990	Khagaul Road, Patna, Bihar 801503	CBSE	None	
St. Michael's High School	1858	Digha	CBSE	Christianity	
St. Xavier's High School	1940	Gandhi Maidan	ICSE	Christianity	
Trinity Global School	2015	New Transport Nagar, Near Zero Mile, N.H.- 30, Patna, Bihar 800007	Central Board of Secondary Education	None	

== Gallery ==
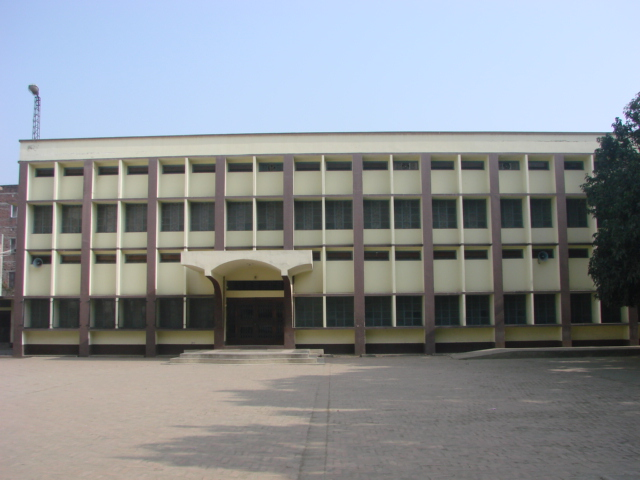
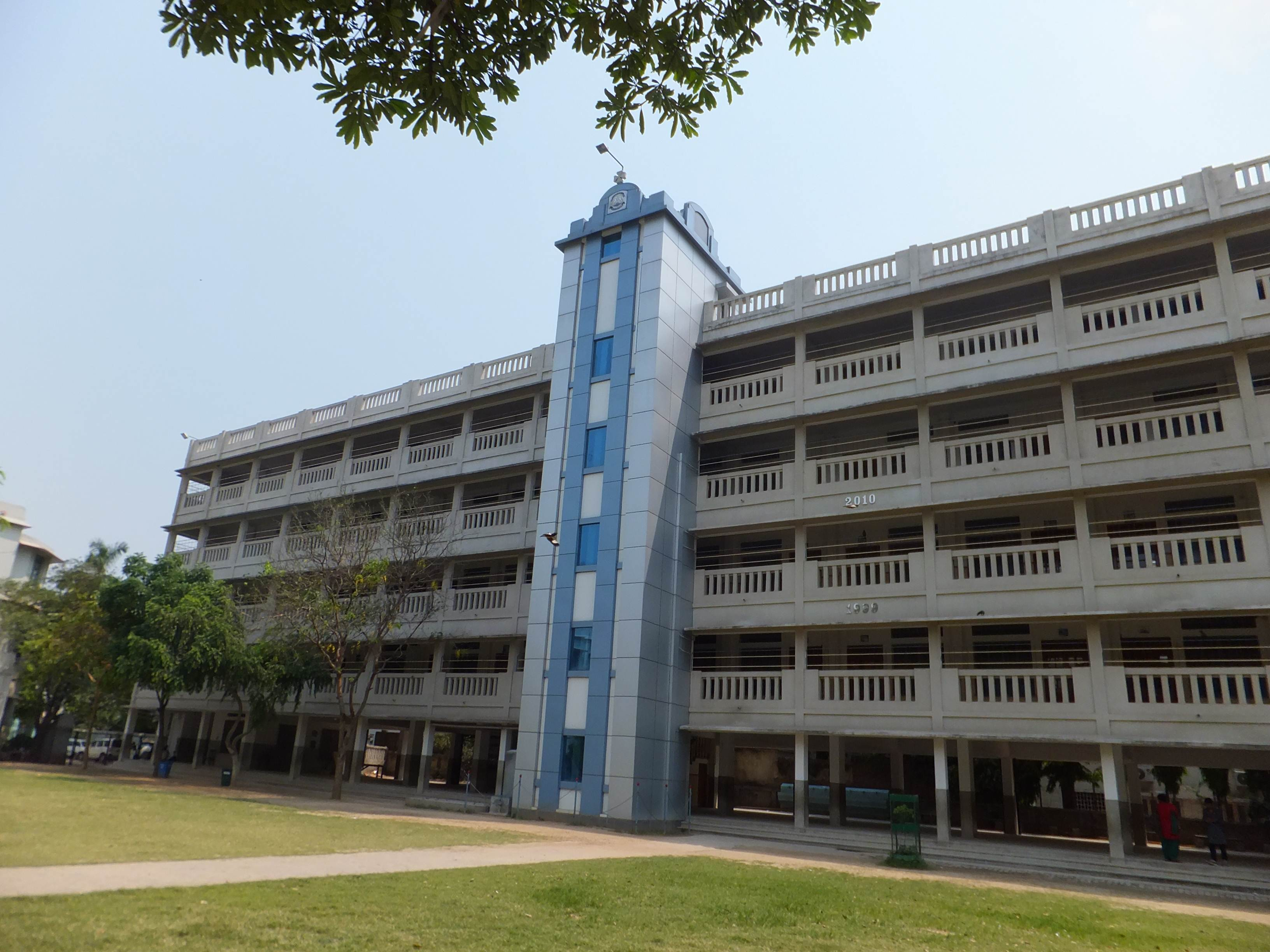
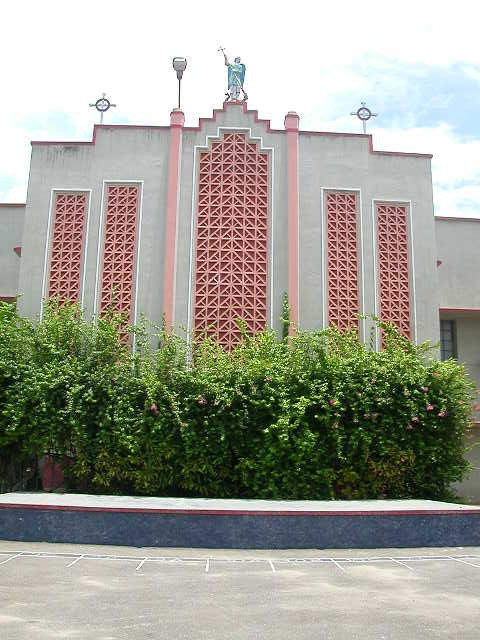
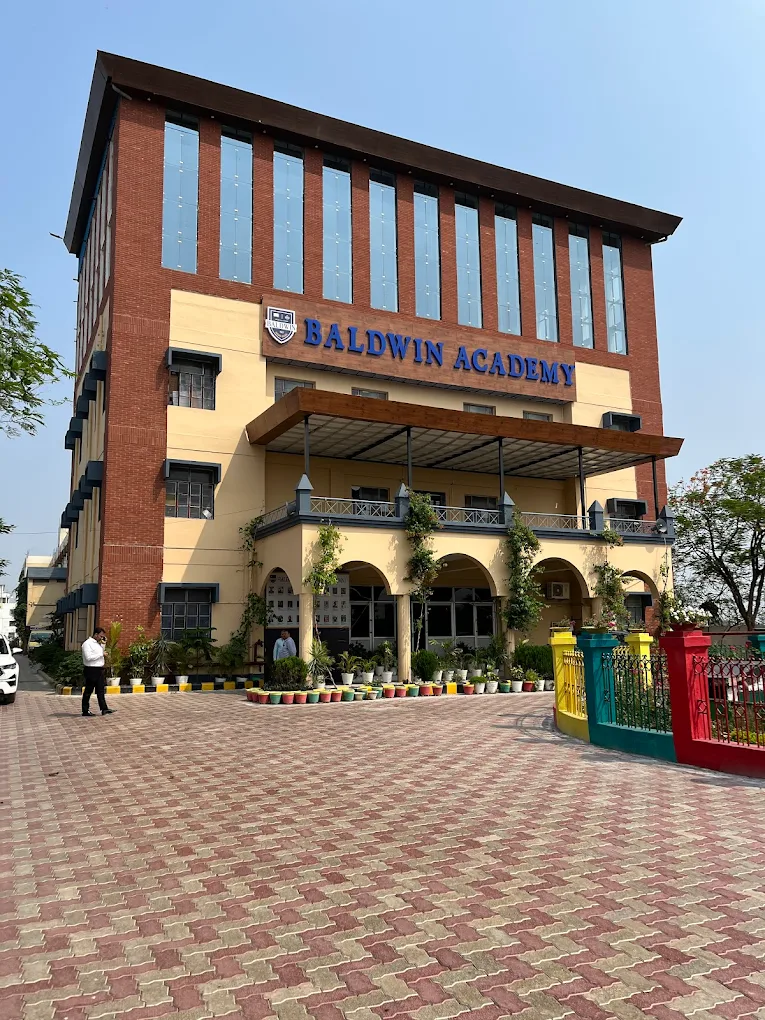
From left to right: Loyola High School, St. Xavier's High School, St. Michael's High School, Baldwin Academy.

== See also ==
- Education in Bihar
- List of educational institutions in Bihar
- List of educational institutions in Patna
