= National Institute of Technology, Patna =

Engineering college in Bihar, India

National Institute of Technology Patna
- Former name: Bihar College of Engineering
- Motto in English: Hard Work and Consistent Efforts
- Type: Public
- Established: 1886 (140 years ago)
- Chairperson: Ashok Kumar Modi
- Director: Pradip Kumar Jain
- Location: Patna, Bihar, India; 25°36′38″N 85°08′30″E
- Campus: Urban
- Website: www.nitp.ac.in

National Institute of Technology Patna (NIT Patna), formerly Bihar School of Engineering and Bihar College of Engineering, is a public engineering institution located in Patna in the Indian state of Bihar. It was renamed as NIT Patna, by the Government of India on 28 January 2004. NIT Patna marked its humble beginning in 1886 with the establishment of pleaders survey training school which was subsequently promoted to Bihar College of Engineering Patna in 1924. This made this institute the 6th Oldest Engineering Institute of India. It is an autonomous institute functioning directly under Ministry of Education, Government of India.

== History ==
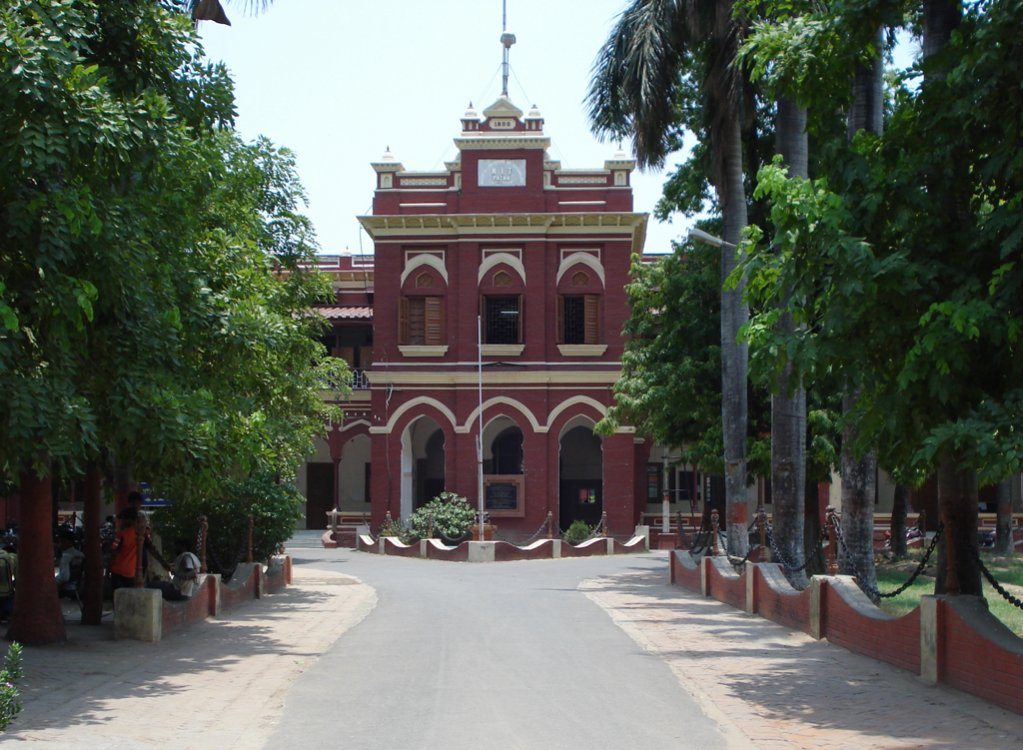
NIT Patna Main building

NIT Patna origin can be traced to 1886 with the establishment of a survey training school and subsequent renaming it to Bihar college of Engineering in 1900. A graduate level curriculum was introduced in 1924. It was renamed Bihar College of Engineering in 1932. In 2004 the government of India upgraded the college to National Institute of Technology (NIT) status, as the state of Bihar had lost its only Regional Engineering College (REC), located at Jamshedpur, when Jharkhand was carved out of Bihar in 2000. By 2002, the Indian government decided to upgrade all RECs to NITs, with the aim of having at least one NIT per state. Bihar College of Engineering was the first institute to be directly upgraded to NIT status. In 2007, it was granted Institute of National Importance status in accordance with the National Institutes of Technology Act, 2007.

== Campus ==
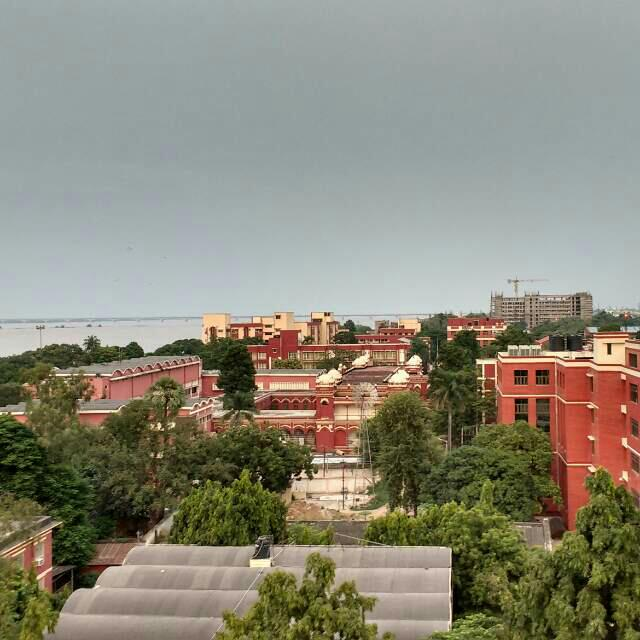
Aerial view of NIT Patna

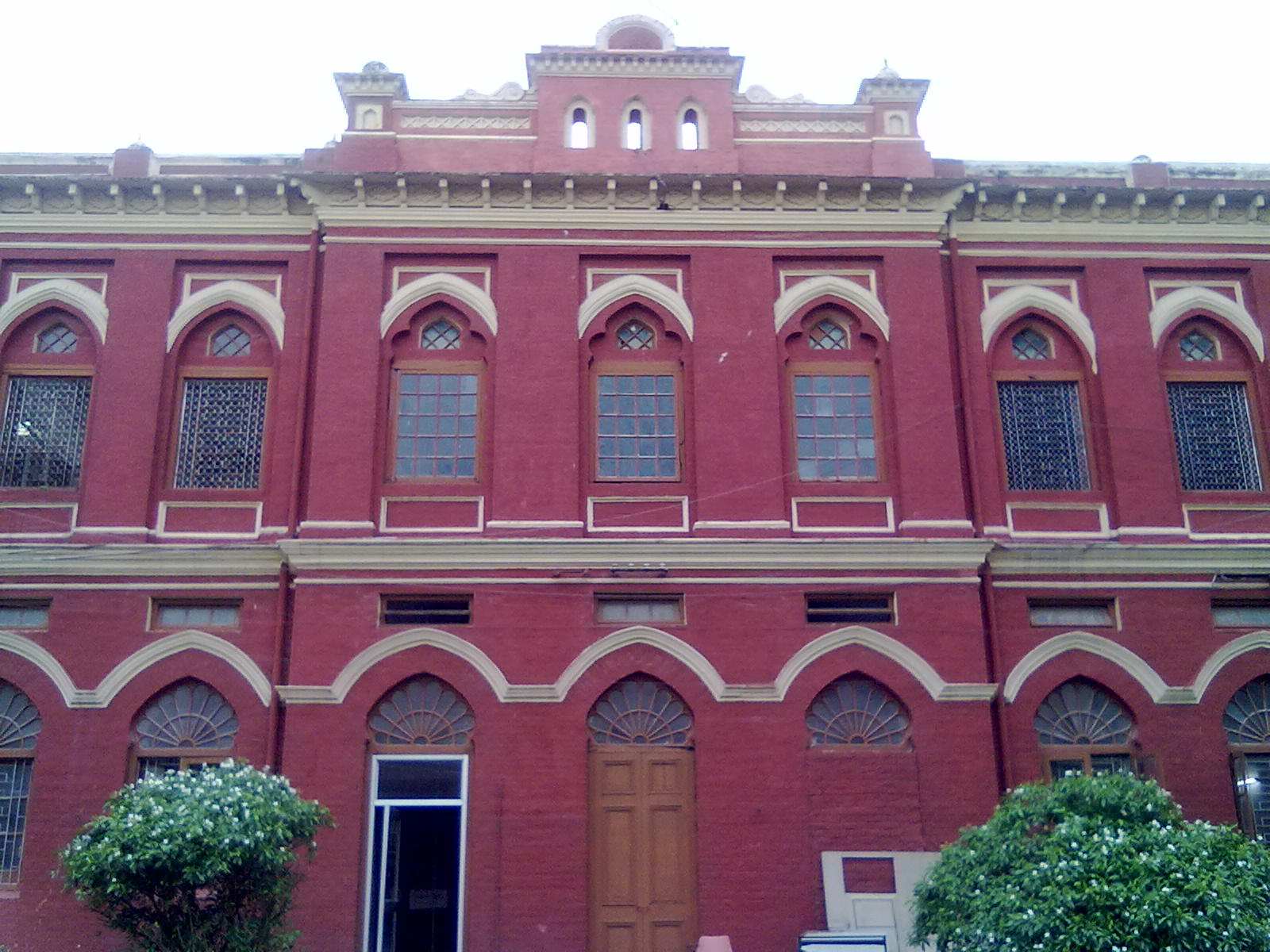
Main Building (Rear view)

NIT Patna functions from a 36 acres (15 ha) campus along Ashok Rajpath, geographically which lies on the southern bank of the river Ganges exactly opposite to the point of its confluence with river Gandak. The campus lies alongside Gandhi Ghat where students usually enjoy scenic views of river Ganges. Land for a new campus, a 125 acres (51 ha) plot, has been assigned at Sikandarpur village in Bihta, around 40 km from Patna. Earlier it was assigned at Dumri village in Bihta.

Incubation center will be built in Patna NIT campus, studies will start in the new campus of Bihta from July. The Government of Bihar has allocated 125 acres of land in Bihta, Patna, for an additional campus of NIT Patna. The new campus is planned to accommodate 6,415 students, developed in three phases:

- Phase I: Facilities for 2,415 students, including buildings, site development, and infrastructure.
- Phase II: Additional facilities for 2,000 more students.
- Phase III: Further expansion to accommodate another 2,000 students.

This phased development aims to expand the institution's capacity significantly.

=== Facilities ===
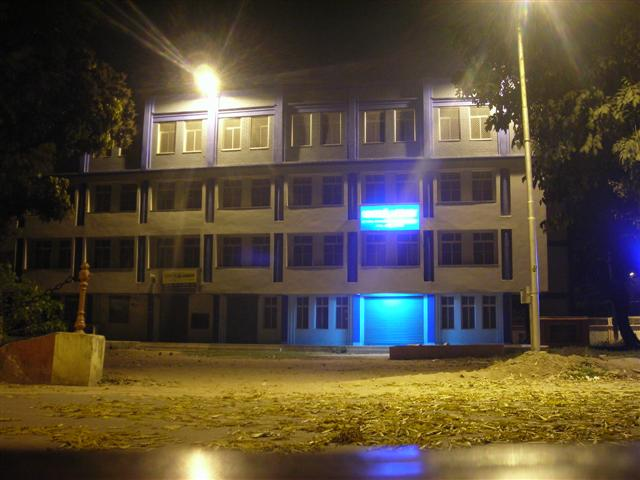
Central library

- Central Library
- Computer Center
- Student Activity center (SAC)
- Gyms (separate for boys and girls.)
- College Canteens (Govt Canteen, Nescafe Canteen)
- Table Tennis and Badminton courts with Synthetic International flooring
- Squash Courts
- Medical Center
- Cricket / Football Ground with stands for 1000+ students

== Academics ==
=== Departments ===
The institute includes the department of Architecture & Planning, Engineering departments of Civil engineering, Computer science & engineering, Electrical engineering, Electronics & Communication engineering and Mechanical engineering. In addition, there are departments for Physics, Chemistry, Mathematics and Humanities & Social Sciences.

=== Library ===
The institute maintains a central library which has 150,000 books and 1,100 e-journals and works for only about 10 hours per day. The Central Library has an e-resource section on the Ground floor, a study section and Library office on the First floor and a separate study room. Library is fully air conditioned and well cleaned. Security is also available on each floor for 24 hours.

=== Computer Center ===
The institute has a computer center with six computer labs and two virtual classrooms equipped with computing and audio-visual facilities such as interactive boards, and projectors. The labs have CCTV cameras for conducting online interviews, tests and presentations. Computer Center has Internet connectivity throughout the day so that the students can use internet facility. A central bandwidth of 1 Gbit/s provided by RailTel for uninterrupted high-speed Internet connection.

=== Ranking ===
University rankings

Engineering – India
- NIRF (2024): 55

Architecture – India
- NIRF (2024): 27

NIT Patna was ranked 55th among engineering colleges in India by the National Institutional Ranking Framework (NIRF) in 2024.

== Student life ==
=== Extracurricular activities ===
From institute website to the annual cultural fest, the institute delegates responsibility to its students wherever possible. With activities and competitions taking place every other day, students are provided with opportunities to develop their soft skills and therefore broaden their perspective. A few notable events are listed below.

=== Festivals ===
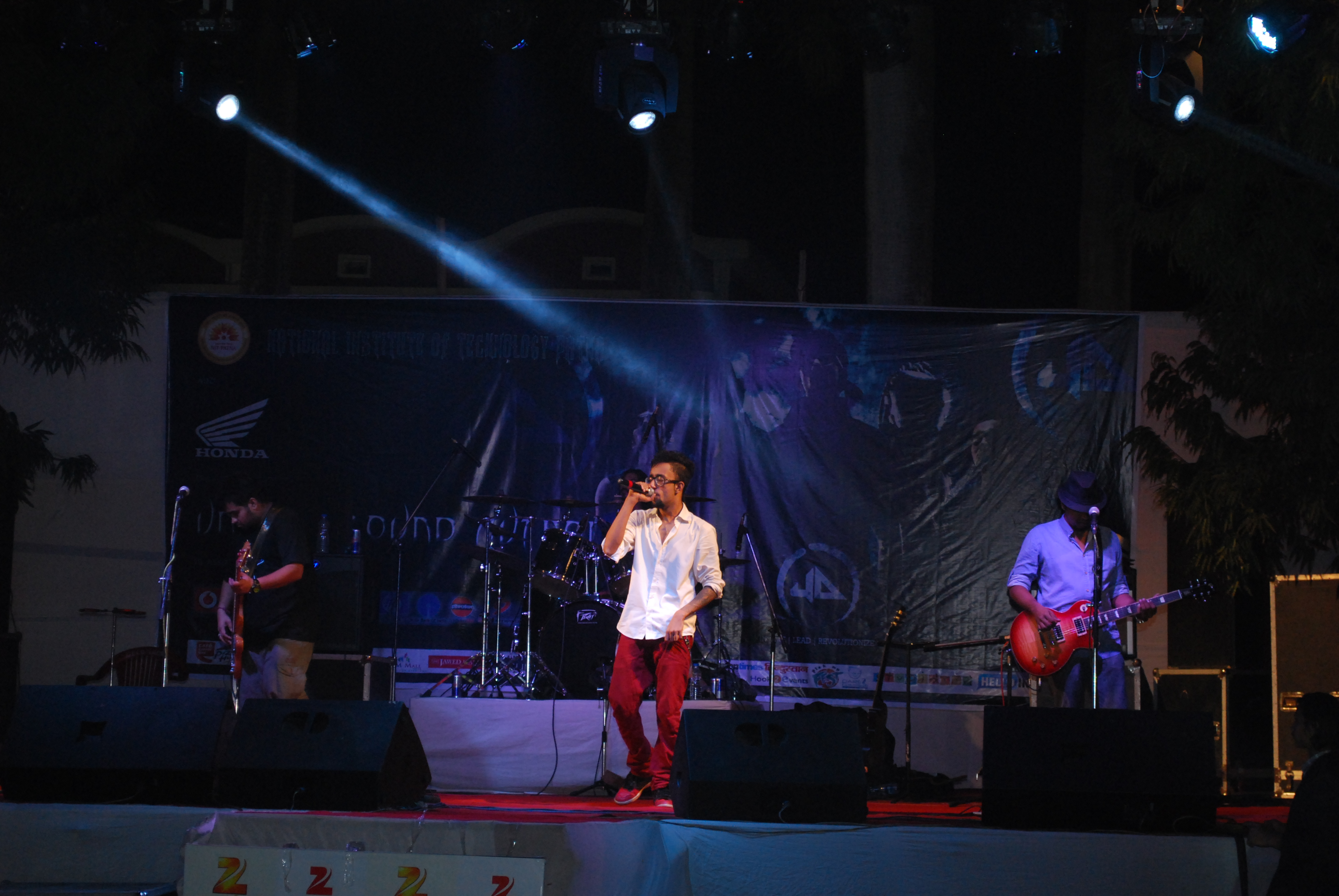
Underground Authority performing at Corona 2014

Until 2015 the college had two separate festivals, the cultural fest Melange and the technical fest Corona. From 2015 onwards the college celebrates Corona and Melange together, occurring every year in January. The event is entirely managed by students. Students from colleges all over the country participate including students from IIT Patna, BIT Patna, Kalinga Institute of Industrial Technology, Rajasthan College of Engineering for Women, Arya Institute of Engineering and Technology, Bengal College of Engineering and Technology, NIT Tripura and NIT Mizoram. Some events also invite students from local schools such St. Michael's High School, Patna, Loyola High School, Patna and Don Bosco Academy.

Cultural fest activities include events such as face painting, singing, dancing, antakshari and rangoli competitions as well as art and craft exhibitions and sports. Technical events include robotics, circuit designing, programming, and presentation competitions and workshops. The festival includes lectures by renown people such as Kumar Vishwas, Irshad Kamil and Srijan Pal Singh. The event also includes performances from bands such as Underground Authority in Corona 2014 and Raeth in Corona 2015.

The students of NIT Patna also celebrate Parakram, the annual intramural sport festival.

=== Indoor and outdoor sports ===
Every year in January, NIT Patna holds a week with events such as cricket, football, table tennis, badminton, carom, and discus throw. Managed by students, this event tests their organising and managerial skills. NIT Patna cricket team were runners up in 2018 inter NIT Trophy. The NIT Patna Strength Games team, which includes weightlifting, powerlifting and bodybuilding has won the overall champions' trophy consecutively in 2018 as well as 2019, while bagging the 'best lifter' trophy in both the years (Kumar Aman, mtech '18 and Rajendra Meena, btech '19)

=== Societies ===
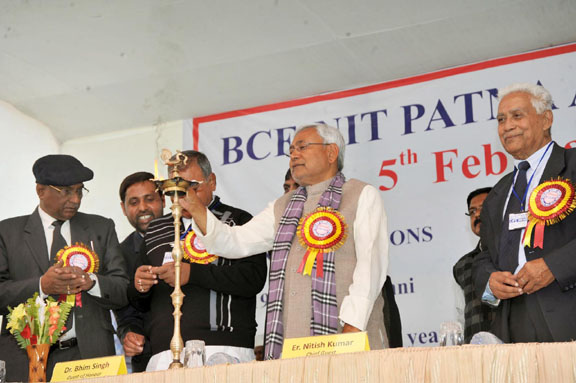
Nitish Kumar (an alumnus of NIT Patna) as a chief guest at a NIT Patna alumni meet

The institute recognizes these major societies and clubs:

- The Common Room Society organizes indoor games competitions like chess, carom, table tennis, badminton, and Sudoku championship.
- The Outdoor Society conducts field events like cricket, football, volleyball, javelin, discus and includes the Athletic Society, which conducts the athletic events.
- The EXE-Extreme Engineering society provides lectures on robotics and embedded systems which is no more functional because of lack of administrative support.
- NIT-Patna started up student chapters with an internationally recognized societies like ASCE (American Society of Civil Engineers) for CE students, ASME (American Society of Mechanical Engineers) for ME students and IEEE (Institute of Electrical and Electronics Engineers) for ECE and EE students.
- SANKALP Ghar Ghar Shiksha Ka- An organization established by the students of NIT Patna in 2007, to teach unprivileged kids from nearby slums. The organization comes under NSS.
- INCUBATION CENTER- Government of Bihar unveiled the Bihar & Start Policy 2017 to foster entrepreneurship and selected NIT Patna as one of the pilot institutes.
- Incubation Center is officially in the list of incubators under the Bihar & Start Policy 2017.
- ASCE SC NITP - American Society of Civil Engineers Student Chapter
- GDSC
- VISTA - photography club
- Get-your-book is a humanitarian club of NITP
- TOTAL-CHAOS - dance club
- TESLA - TECHNICAL ELECTRICAL SOCIETY of LEARNING and APPLICATION
- DesCo - design club
- expresso - art and literature club
- natvansh - drama and film club
- saptak - music club

=== Residential Student halls ===
The housing facilities (hostels) are:

Boys hostels:

- Sone Hostel Block A (earlier known as New Engineer's Hostel)
- Sone Hostel Block B (earlier known as Engineer's Hostel-1)
- Kosi Hostel (new)
- Bagmati Hostel (earlier known as Engineers' Hostel-2)
- Brahmaputra Hostel (new)
- OFQ (old faculty quarters) and FH (faculty house) can be allotted to only a few first years if there are not enough rooms in other hostels.

Girls hostels:

- Ganga Hostel (Blocks A, B and C earlier knows as Girl Engineer's Hostel – GEH)

These hostels now can accommodate all of the students because of the newly constructed Brahmaputra hostel making it a fully residential campus.

== Notable alumni ==
- Bindeshwari Dubey, 17th Chief Minister of Bihar
- Nitish Kumar, 22nd Chief Minister of Bihar
- Ratan Kumar Sinha, Chairman of Atomic Energy Commission of India (AEC); Secretary, Department of Atomic Energy (DAE)
- Bhubaneswar Behera, an engineer, writer and a scholar from Odisha
- Manas Bihari Verma, Indian aeronautical scientist
- Raja Ram Singh Kushwaha, Member of Lok Sabha

== See also ==
- Patna University
- National Institute of Technology, Durgapur
- National Institute of Technology, Rourkela
- National Institute of Technology, Hamirpur
- National Institute of technology, Jamshedpur
