= St. Joseph's Convent High School, Patna =

St. Joseph's Convent High School
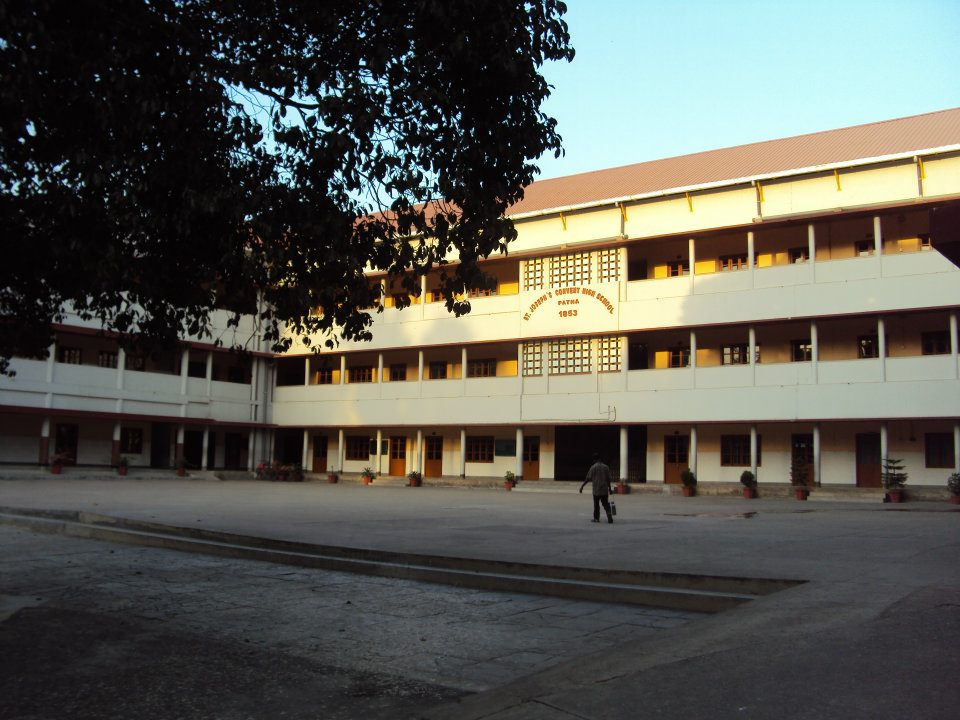
- Main Building

Location
- Ashok Rajpath; Bankipur; Patna, Bihar, 800004; India
- Coordinates: 25°37′13″N 85°9′15″E

Information
- School type: Private Girls
- Motto: "Nisi Dominus Frustr" ("Without God nothing prospers")
- Religious affiliation: Roman Catholic
- Patron saint: Saint Joseph
- Established: 1853; 173 years ago
- Founder: Anastasius Hartmann
- Status: Active
- School board: Indian Certificate of Secondary Education; Bihar School Examination Board
- School district: Patna
- Session: April–March
- School code: BI004 (ICSE)
- Principal: Sr. Josephine CJ
- Provincial Superior: Sr. Vijaya CJ
- Gender: Girls School
- Enrollment: 3000
- Average class size: 55-60
- Language: English, Hindi
- Schedule type: Morning
- Hours in school day: 5-6 hrs
- Classrooms: Well-Equipped
- Campuses: Bankipur, Patna
- Campus: Urban
- Campus size: 6 acres (2.4 ha)
- Houses: Ruby, Topaz, Emerald, Sapphire
- Sports: Basketball, martial arts, table-tennis, carom, chess, throw ball, karate, badminton
- Affiliations: ICSE, BSEB

St. Joseph's Convent High School, Patna, is a private, girls high school in Bankipur neighborhood of Patna, Bihar, India. It is a Catholic Missionary educational institution established in 1853, managed by Sisters of Congregation of Jesus. It has two sections, one is affiliated to the Council for the Indian School Certificate Examinations, New Delhi and another is affiliated to Bihar School Examination Board. It is one of the oldest schools in the state of Bihar and was founded by the first Bishop of Patna, Anastasius Hartmann.

== History ==
In 1849, Bishop Anastasius Hartmann, who was responsible for the Patna-Bettiah section of the North India Mission, acquired a sizable piece of land (about five acres) in Bankipore where he laid the foundation of a chapel on September 23, 1849. The Roman Catholic Church, St. Joseph's, was opened in 1850.

In 1852, on invitation of Bishop Anastasius Hartmann, the Apostolic Vicar of Patna, a group of five Institute of the Blessed Virgin Mary Sisters from Munich Province in Germany came to India. These five sisters were Sisters Maria Groeppner, Angela Hoffman, Aloysia Maher, Antonia Feth and Catherine Schreibman. The sisters landed in Bombay by ship and then set out for Patna. They traveled from Bombay to Patna by bullock cart through the thick jungles. They left Bombay in early September 1852 and reached Patna around February 1853. They established the first IBVM House in Bankipore in 1853, on the bank of River Ganges. The house and school bear the name of Saint Joseph. Bankipore, as the first foundation, was considered the mother house of the Institute in India. St. Joseph's was the only convent between Calcutta and Agra at that time.

Initially, in addition to the boarding and day school, there were two orphanages on the school campus. One for native girls and another for European and Eurasian girls. More buildings were added and the institution gradually grew over time. A Hindi section was founded in 1950. Currently the school is affiliated to ICSE as well as Bihar State Board. It has a 100% pass percentage in ICSE examination board results for many years and also produced several state and city toppers.

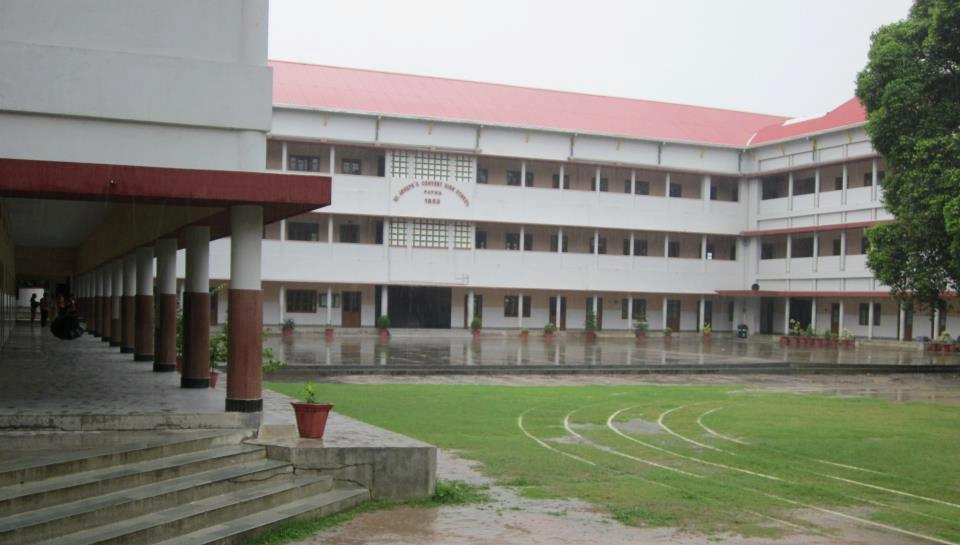
Main Building

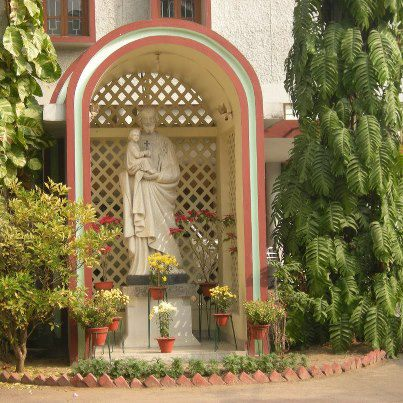
Statue of St. Joseph holding Jesus in School

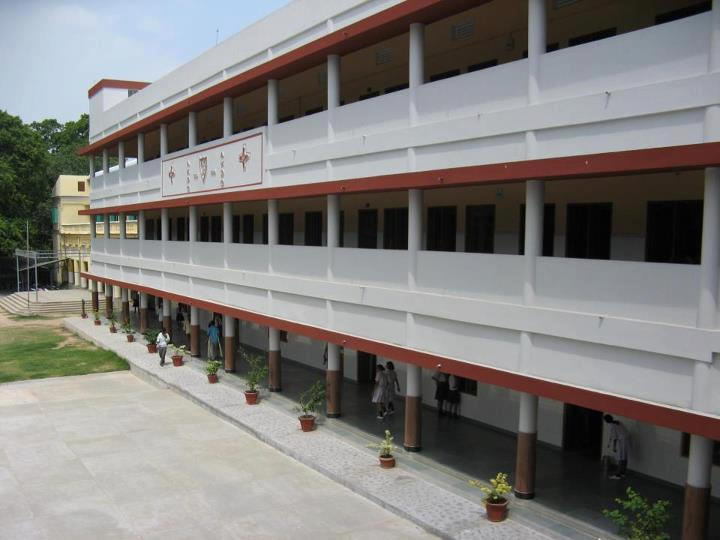
School Building

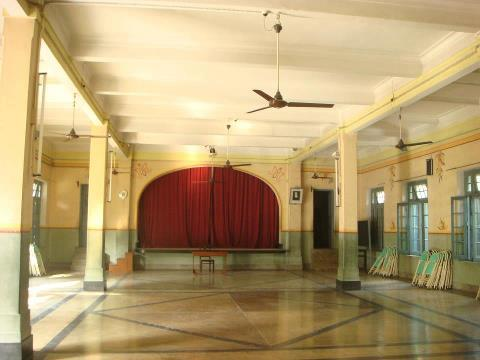
Auditorium

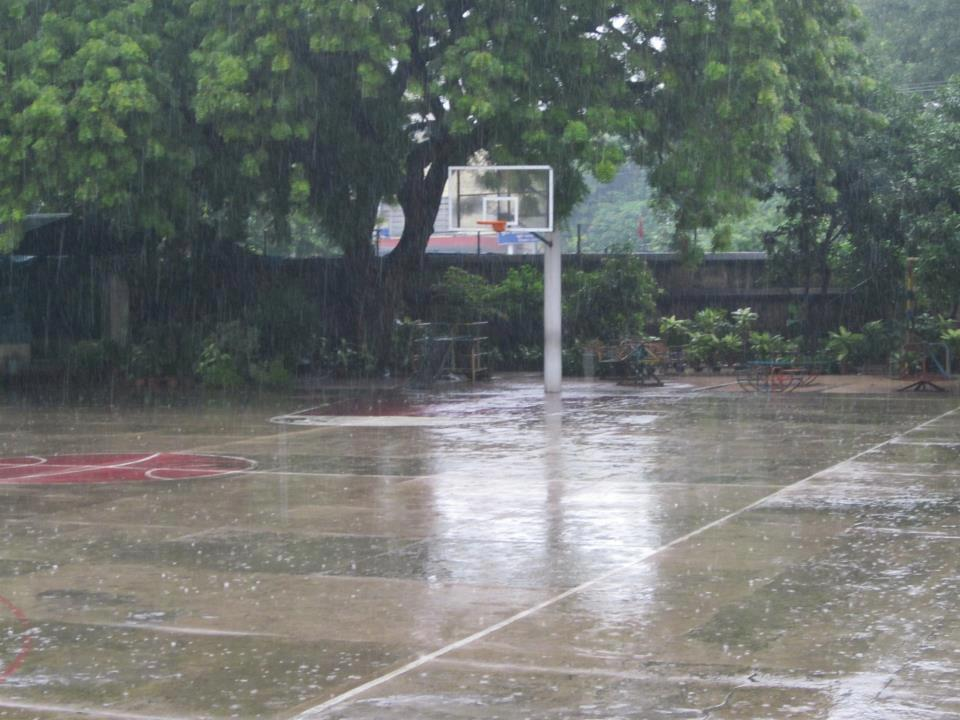
Basketball Field

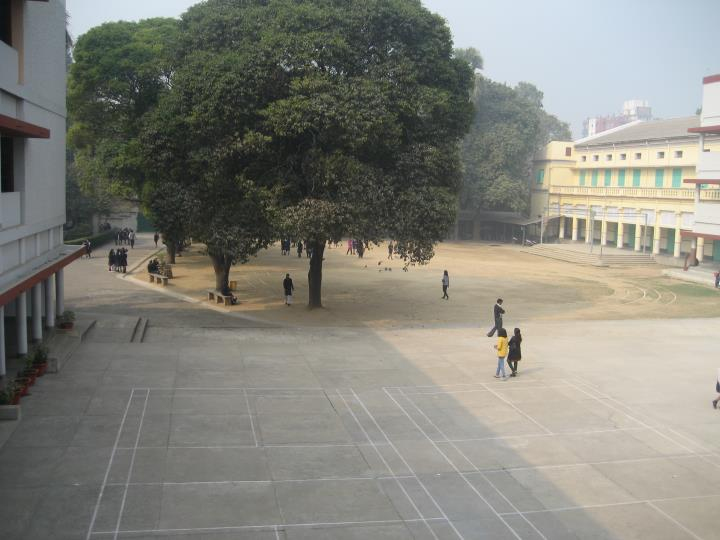
School Field

The school is on Ashok Rajpath road, on the banks of river Ganges in Bankipur neighborhood of Patna.

== Academic ==
=== Affiliation ===
The school is affiliated to the Council for the Indian School Certificate Examinations, New Delhi. There is another Hindi section of the school which is affiliated with the Bihar School Examination Board. The school prepares the students for Indian Certificate of Secondary Education and the Indian School Certificate examinations for Class X and Class XII respectively.

=== Medium of instruction ===
School follows English medium of instruction for its ICSE affiliated section. Another Hindi section affiliated with the Bihar Board uses Hindi as medium of instruction to teach students.

== School session ==
The school year is from April to March. Days are divided into nine -periods with summer and winter timings.

== Motto and houses ==
The motto of the institution is Nisi Dominus Frustra (Latin), which means Without god, nothing prospers. The four school houses are:

- Ruby (Motto: On Wings of Loyalty)
- Topaz (Motto: Effort spells Success)
- Emerald (Motto: Truth alone Triumphs)
- Sapphire (Motto: Unity is Strength)

== Notable alumni ==
- Papiya Ghosh
- Nidhi Yasha
- Karishma Sharma

== See also ==
- List of schools in India
- List of schools in Patna
- St. Xavier's High School, Patna
- St. Michael's High School, Patna
- Notre Dame Academy, Patna
