= Digha, Patna =

Digha Digha Ghat
- Neighbourhood
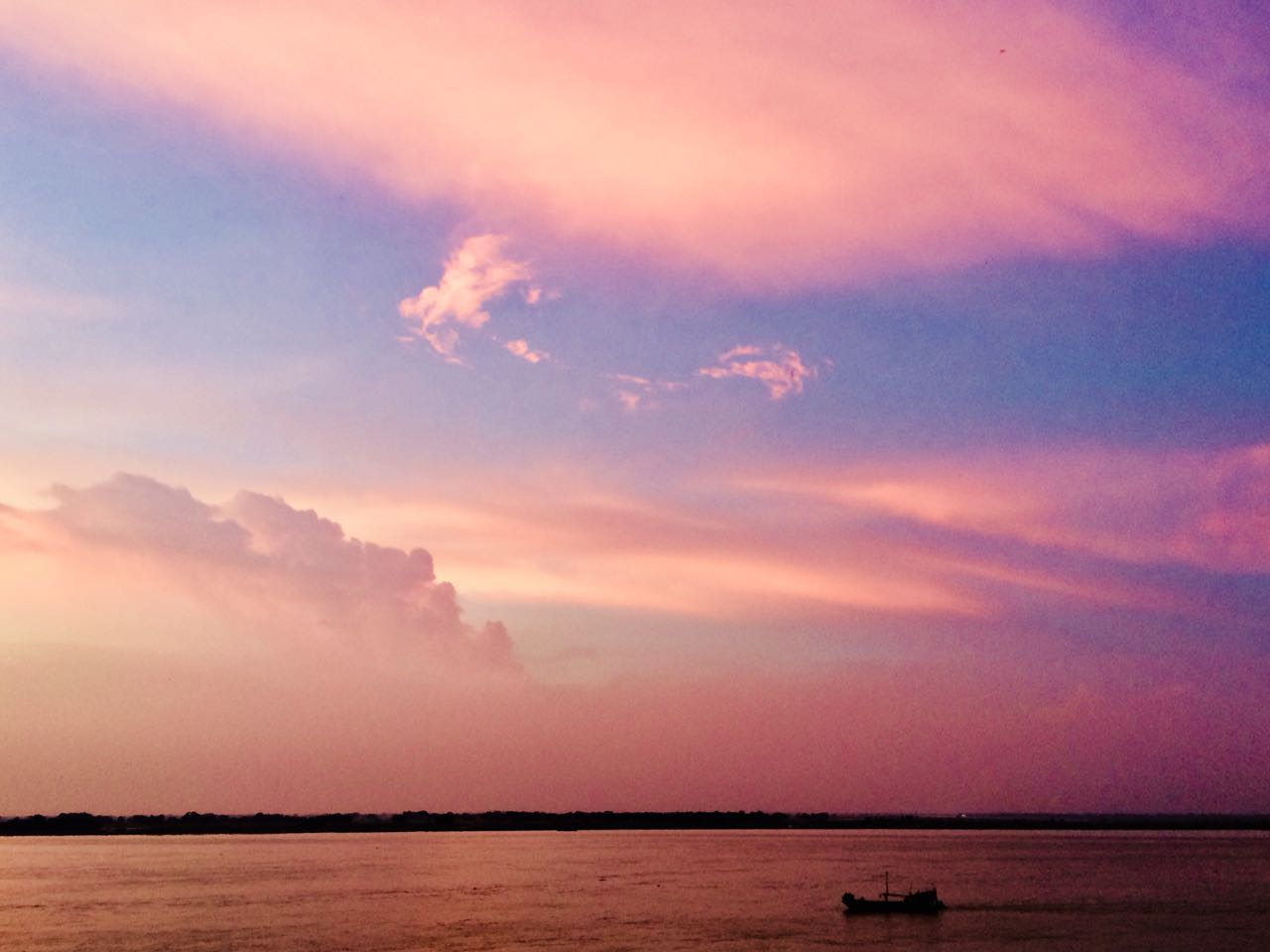
- Digha ghat at Patna

- Location in Patna, India
- Coordinates: 25°38′28″N 85°5′26″E
- Country: India
- State: Bihar
- Metro: Patna

Languages
  - Spoken: Hindi, English, Magahi
- Time zone: UTC+5:30 (IST)
- PIN: 800011; 800012
- Planning agency: Patna Metropolitan Area Authority
- Civic agency: Patna Municipal Corporation

Digha, also spelled as Deega in colonial documents, is a residential neighbourhood in Patna. The area is served by Digha police station under Patna Police. Digha is mostly known for the "Ghats" mean place near Ganga river. It comes under Digha Assembly constituency.

== History ==
Digha, during the British Raj, was a village and agricultural area in Patna. Digha was famous for its mangoes orchards, moreover, famous Mango variety Digha Malda, which is popular in Bihar and even outside the state, got its name from it. In 1858, the Congregation of Christian Brothers established St. Michael's High School, Patna, the second oldest catholic institution in the city (now owned by the Jesuits). The school provided education to the children of Catholics, British expatriates and Anglo-Indians only. The major developments in the area took place after the 19th century, which helped spur high-density residential development in the locality. Digha was a forest(jungle). The second oldest Indian railway line was located at Digha ( Digha Ghat - Patna Ghat Railway Line), after the Bombay-Thane railway line.

== Developments ==
It has developed into a crowded residential colony of Patna; marked by residential houses and high raise apartments. Its proximity to western Patna, development of Gola road which connects it to Bailey Road, AIIMS-Digha Elevated Corridor (Patli Path) and the proposed road on Ganga and the opening of Digha–Sonpur bridge would provide easy access to the people. Digha Bridge Halt connect the Patna Junction, Patliputra Junction and Sonpur station to Digha. The distance between the Digha-Sonpur bridge and this halt is around 2 km.

== Landmarks ==
- Digha Bridge Halt railway station
- Digha Ghat
- Patliputra Junction railway station
- Tarumitra Ashram

== Education ==
- St. Michael's High School, Patna
- Loyola High School, Patna
- St. Paul's High School, Patna
- St. Xavier's College, Patna
- St. Xavier's College of Education
- Don Bosco Academy
- St. Dominic Savio’s High School

== Popular Place in Digha ==
- Digha Haat (vegetables market)
- ITI Campus
- WITI (Women's ITI)
- Ghats (near JP Setu)
