= Tarumitra =

- Logo of Tarumitra
- Formation: 1989
- Type: NGO
- Headquarters: Tarumitra Ashram, XTTI, Digha, Patna-800 011, India
- Coordinates: 25.3820°N 85.54°E
- Members: 2,00,000 (approx.)
- Director: Fr. Robert Athical, SJ
- Website: Official website

Tarumitra is a nationwide students' organization to promote ecological sensitivity in India. It has been campaigning for sensitizing various sections of society on ecological issues. It was started in 1988 by students in Patna, India. U.N has conferred a Special Consultative Status to Tarumitra from 2005. It has over 2,00,000 members in over 1000 high schools and colleges. Tarumitra has also had several full-time volunteers from abroad.

Tarumitra has also set up a bio-reserve in Patna in a plot of land given to them by the Patna Jesuits. It has a rare collection of over 400 vanishing trees and plants of North India. The centre has a large genetic nursery, a Tissue Culture lab and facilities to accommodate 50-100 students for nature related camps.

== History ==
Tarumitra, meaning "Friends of Trees" in Hindi and Sanskrit, is a student movement to protect and promote a healthy environment on Earth. It was the effort of Jesuit Fr. Robert Athickal from St. Xavier's School, Patna and students from few schools under the leadership of Anindo Banerjee, a class IX student from Loyola High School, Patna, that the movement came into existence in 1988. In April 1989, four high school students from Loyla High School, Anindo Banerjee, Vijay Mathur, Sanjay Pandey and Jayant Chatterjee, set out on a cycle rally in North India from Patna to New Delhi to promote awareness about the environment and the movement. They met with the then vice president of India, Shankar Dayal Sharma, to present their findings. While returning, at Agra, Jayant fell seriously ill and despite attempts, could not be saved. His demise shocked the movement; however, his sacrifice for the environment incentivized his companions to work and promote the movement with great zeal. Today, Jayant's sacrifice is one of the cornerstones of Tarumitra's foundation history, which is still remembered the same way as 30 years ago.

=== Growth ===
Invigorated by the spirit of the late Jayant Chatterjee, Tarumitra grew up with assistance from Sr. Gita SND, Principal of Hartmann High School, Fr. George Manimala S.J., the then Principal of St. Xavier's High School, Patna and Bro. Geo Pulickal, his assistant, who went out of their way to establish the organisation's firm footing. Kumar Hemant Sinha, a student of 1990 batch of St. Xavier's High School, Patna was chosen its first President. Through their efforts, the present headquarters of the movement, Tarumitra Ashram, was inaugurated by the Collector of Patna, Arvind Prasad, on 20 February 1991. In 1994, the St Xavier’s School gave Tarumitra a 10-acre plot for a plantation at Digha, Patna.

The strength of Tarumitra also increased rapidly. The girls of the local Hartmann High School, under the leadership of Sr. Gita SND and Sr. Roshni SND, gave the initial fillip needed for any new organisation. Units after units of Tarumitra sprang up in various schools in and around Patna. Many college students, social activists and journalists have also joined Tarumitra in its crusade against the destruction of the environment of India.

== Campaigns ==
The activists of Tarumitra have taken out massive rallies, organized protest demonstrations, resisted the felling of trees and forests, built road side gardens, cleaned up garbage dumps, planted rare variety of trees, and conducted house-to-house awareness campaigns, among other activities. Tarumitra has developed several garbage dumps into roadside gardens called 'Oxygen Belts'. Each garden is maintained by a School or a plant nursery. Tarumitra maintained a total of 38 Oxygen belts at one point in time. Working with Swiss physicist Wolfgong Scheffler, Tarumitra activist M.M Mathew SJ helped to set up a plant to fabricate solar cookers alongside solar panels to harness solar energy. The activists has also taken out processions to campaign against the use of plastics.

== Today ==
Tarumitra has expanded from the city of Patna to the remote areas of the country. It has joined hands with similar organizations to support the cause. One of the significant steps has been to set up Bio-reserves like the one in Patna in other parts of the country. As of now similar initiatives are coming up in Gujarat, Meghalaya, Tamil Nadu, Karnataka and Kerala. Tarumitra also takes part in International summits on environment.

Tarumitra received Special Consultative Status (ECOSOC) from the Economic and Social Council of the United Nations from 2005. The organization has supported the participation of hundreds of students in the activities of the United Nations. Many have participated in the U.N Meetings and conferences across the globe.
