= St. Xavier's College, Patna =

College in Bihar, India

Coordinates: 25.6451°N 85.1012°E

St. Xavier's College of management and technology
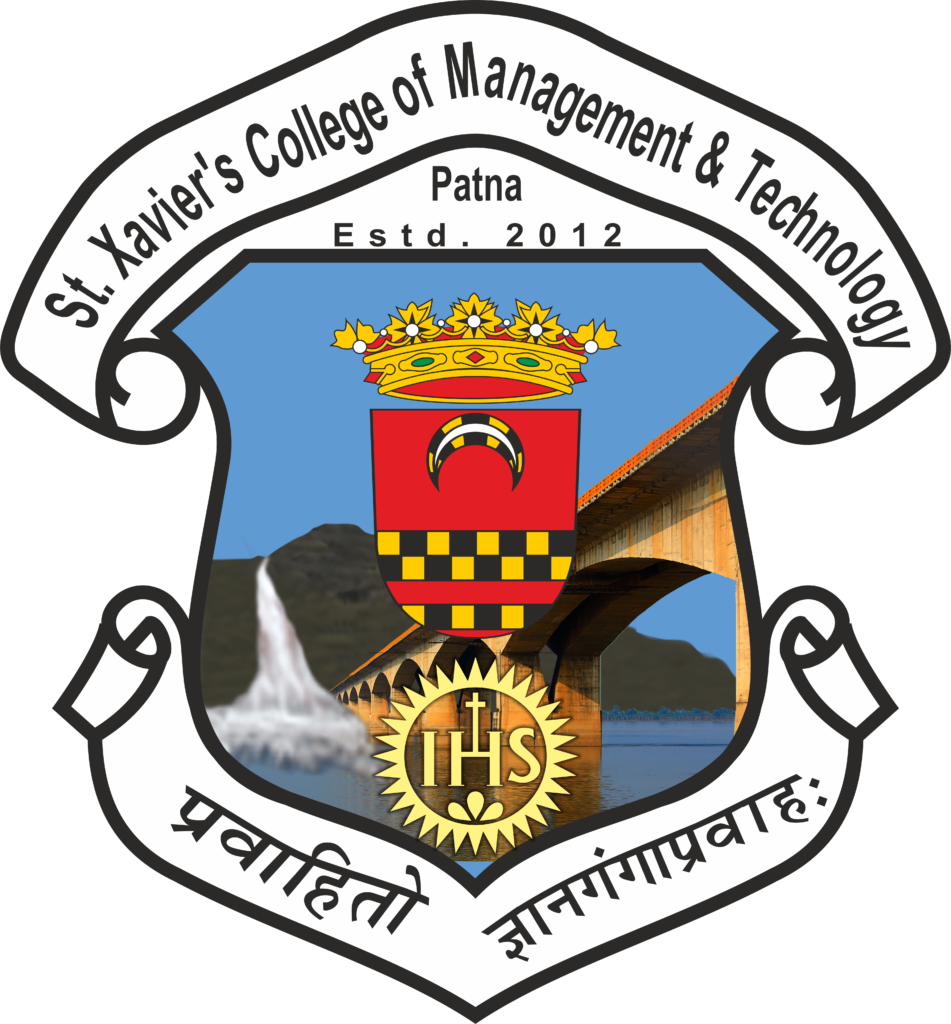
- Other name: SXC Patna
- Motto: Pravahito Gyan Ganga Pravah (Sanskrit)
- Motto in English: Let the streams of Gyan (knowledge) Ganga keep on flowing
- Type: Private
- Established: 2009; 17 years ago
- Religious affiliation: Jesuit (Roman Catholic)
- Academic affiliations: Aryabhatta Knowledge University; Patliputra University
- Rector: Fr Joseph Sebastian SJ
- Principal: Fr (Dr) Martin Poras SJ
- Location: XTTI Campus, Digha, Patna, 800 011 Bihar, India
- Campus: Urban
- Website: www.sxcpatna.edu.in

St. Xavier's College of Management and technology, Patna (SXCMT Patna or SXC) is an undergraduate college of Arts, IT and Commerce under Aryabhatta Knowledge University, Patna in Patna, Bihar, India. Founded in 2009, it is named after St. Francis Xavier, a Spanish Jesuit saint of the 16th century and missionary to India. It is a co-educational, self-financed, Catholic minority institution, operated by the Patna Province of the Society of Jesus. On November 9, 2022 NACC acceredited with CGPA of 2.90 on four point scale at B++ Grade in first cycle.

== History ==
The Jesuits first came to Patna in 1919, and in early 1930 were approached to set up a school in the city of Patna. Fr. Loesch, assisted by Fr. Marshall D. Moran, opened a Cambridge school to serve Patna and Bihar. Later, in 1940, St. Xavier's High School, Patna was built at Gandhi Maidan Marg. Then in 2009 the Jesuits founded St. Xavier's College, Patna. Classes began at a temporary location opposite St. Michael's High School, Digha. In June 2011 the college moved to its permanent location on a sprawling, 36- acre campus at XTTI on Digha Ashiana Road.

== Authority ==
The college was founded in Patna in 2009 with its first principal Fr. T. Nishant, S.J. and he is still the principal.

Other present authorities are

- Rector Fr. Joseph Sebastian , S.J.
- Principal Fr. Dr. Martin Poras, S.J.
- Vice Principal Fr.Sushil Bilung,SJ
- Administrator Fr. Jeevan Prakash Isahak, S.J.
- Controller of Examinations Fr. Dr. Alphonse Sebastian, S.J.
- Finance officer Fr. Alphonse Crasta, S.J.
- Library Director Fr. Sherry George,SJ

== Academics ==
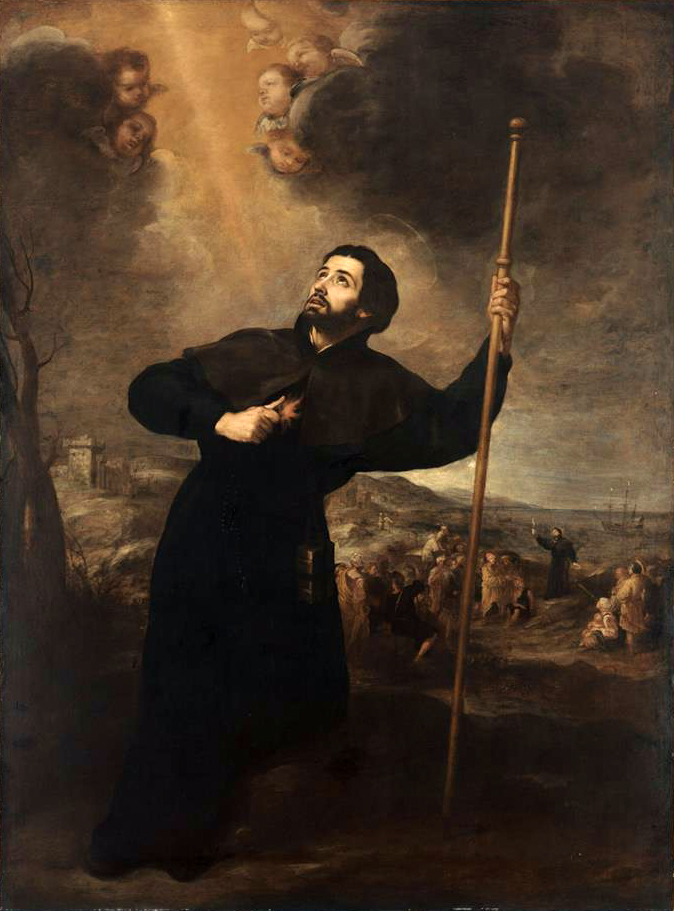
Francis Xavier, the namesake of the college

St. Xavier's College, Patna, offers three-year undergraduate degree courses, such as Bachelor of Arts (B.A. Hons.) English and Economics and Bachelor of Commerce (B.Com.) from Magadh University, and Bachelor of Business Administration (B.B.A.) and Computer Application (B.C.A.) from Aryabhatta Knowledge University. Besides mid-term tests, students are evaluated through at least two examinations at the end of each term. Failure in these examinations disqualifies them from the annual University examinations.

== Clubs and societies ==
These are the famous clubs and Societies of students at St. Xavier's College Patna campus.

- Bihar aicuf(Media Person : Sushant kumar)
- Xavir's Coding club
- Xavier's Music club
- Xavier's Sports club
- Xavier's Dance club
- Xavier's Theatre club
- Xavier's Poetry club
- Xavier's social Awareness club
- YFI- Youth For Free India
- Xavier's Placement Cell
- Xavier's public address club and many more such clubs and societies are there in SXC Patna where students take membership and work under

== Emblem ==
The college emblem contains the motto Pravahito Gyan Ganga Pravah (Sanskrit): "Let the streams of Gyan (knowledge) Ganga keep on flowing." The college is situated beside the river Ganga and like the flowing river would ensure that the streams of Gyan keep on flowing and liberating people, building bridges of understanding. The Sun with the letters IHS (first three letters for Jesus in Greek) is a symbol for the Society of Jesus. The emblem within the emblem, containing crown and crescent moon, is the coat of arms of the noble family of its patron, St. Francis Xavier.

== Sister institutions ==
The sister institutions of St. Xavier's College in Patna are

- St. Xavier's High School, Patna
- St. Michael's High School, Patna
- St. Xavier's College of Education

== See also ==
- List of Jesuit sites
