= Amitava Kumar =

Indian writer and journalist (born 1963)

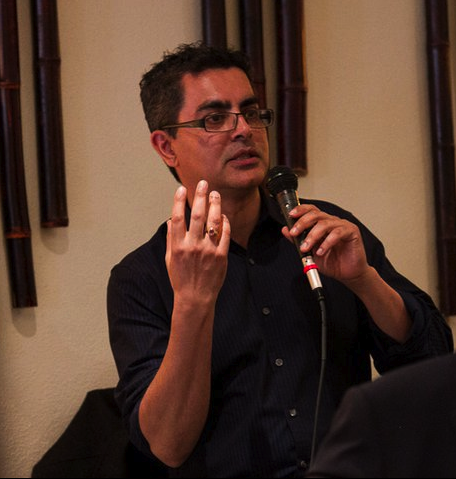
- Kumar speaking at the Asian American Writers Workshop in 2011.
- Born: 17 March 1963 (age 63); Arrah, Bihar, India
- Education: Delhi University; Syracuse University; University of Minnesota
- Occupation: Professor of English at Vassar College
- Awards: Guggenheim Fellowship <https://www.gf.org/fellows/all-fellows/amitava-kumar/>, United States Artists Fellow <https://www.unitedstatesartists.org/fellow/amitava-kumar/>, Cullman Center Fellowship at the New York Public Library <https://www.nypl.org/blog/2023/04/12/meet-cullman-center-scholars-and-writers>

Amitava Kumar (born 17 March 1963) is an Indian writer and journalist. At Vassar College, he is Professor of English on the Helen D. Lockwood Chair.

== Personal life ==
Kumar was born in the city of Arrah in the Indian state of Bihar on 17 March 1963 and grew up in the nearby city of Patna. He attended St Michael's High School. In India, Kumar earned a bachelor's degree in political science from Hindu College, Delhi University in 1984.

He holds two master's degrees in Linguistics and Literature from Delhi University (1986) and Syracuse University (1988), respectively. In 1993, he received his doctoral degree from the Department of Cultural Studies and Comparative Literature at the University of Minnesota. Kumar lives with his family in Poughkeepsie, New York.

== Work ==
=== Overview ===
Kumar has an extensive and wide-spanning body of literary work. His journalistic writing has appeared in Granta, The New Yorker, The New York Times, Harper’s Magazine, BRICK, Guernica, New Statesman, The Caravan, The Indian Express, The Hindu, and The Nation. Both his nonfiction books and novels have received critical acclaim. His novel Home Products (2007, and as Nobody Does the Right Thing, 2010) was short-listed for India's premier literary prize, the Vodafone Crossword Book Award. His later novel, Immigrant, Montana (2018) was named a Book of the Year at The New Yorker, Notable Book of the Year by The New York Times, and was on President Obama’s list of favorite books of 2018. More recently, his book A Time Outside This Time (2021) was described by The New Yorker as “a shimmering assault on the Zeitgeist.” Kumar’s latest novel My Beloved Life (2024) was praised by James Wood as “beautiful, truthful fiction.”

As for his nonfiction work, his book A Foreigner Carrying in the Crook of His Arm a Tiny Bomb: A Writer’s Report on the Global War on Terror (2010, and as Evidence of Suspicion, 2009) was the 2011 Winner for Nonfiction in the Asian American Literary Awards. In a review by The New York Times, Dwight Garner called the book a "perceptive and soulful…meditation on the global war on terror and its cultural and human repercussions." It was also the 2010 staff pick at Publishers Weekly. Husband of a Fanatic (2005) was an "Editors' Choice" book at the New York Times; Bombay-London-New York (2002) was on the list of "Books of the Year" in New Statesman (UK); and Passport Photos (2000) won an "Outstanding Book of the Year" award from the Myers Program for the Study of Bigotry and Human Rights in North America.

Kumar has conducted and participated in several notable interviews, including his interview of Indian novelist Arundhati Roy in February 2011. In 2008, on Al Jazeera's Riz Khan Show, Kumar was interviewed on the use of terror threats by governments to advance their own political agendas; the interview aired on the Al Jazeera English Network.

The content of Kumar's writing has been significantly affected by the death of his parents, reflecting on them in several of his works. He explores rituals of death, grief, and memory in his essay “Pyre,” which was selected by Jonathan Franzen for Best American Essays 2016. In a 2024 article for Lit Hub, he discusses the death of his father and the ways in which writers contend with the loss of their parents in their work.

His academic writing and literary criticism have appeared in several journals, including Critical Inquiry, Cultural Studies, Critical Quarterly, College Literature, Race and Class, American Quarterly, Rethinking Marxism, Minnesota Review, Journal of Advanced Composition, Amerasia Journal and Modern Fiction Studies.

Kumar was also the scriptwriter for two documentary films. He worked on Dirty Laundry (2005),a film about the national-racial politics of Indian South Africans. He also narrated and wrote the script for the prize-winning documentary film Pure Chutney (1997) about the descendants of indentured Indian laborers in Trinidad.

At Vassar College, “Professor Kumar teaches classes that mainly deal with: reportage; the essay-form, both in prose and film; cities; literatures describing the global movement of goods and people; war; memory-work.”

Many of Kumar’s former students have made important contributions to art, literature, and journalism. He taught award-winning poet and author Mikko Harvey, who has received multiple fellowships for his writing. He also taught photographer Caleb Stein, whose work has received several awards and has been displayed in many prominent collections and publications. Kumar’s former student Lucas Mann is a critically acclaimed author and writer. He is currently an associate professor at University of Massachusetts Dartmouth where he teaches courses in creative writing, journalism, and professional writing. His student Alanna Okun is a writer who was a senior editor at Vox Media. He also taught Kelly Stout, a writer and editor whose work has appeared in publications like The New Yorker and Esquire. Okun and Stout both cite Kumar’s teaching as an important part of their development as writers.

=== Book synopses ===
- Passport Photos (2000) is “a report on the immigrant condition” that blends “theory, poetry, cultural criticism, and photography.” It explores “the complexities of the immigration experience, intervening in the impersonal language of the state.”
- Blending memoir with literary criticism, Bombay–London–New York (2002) “tells the story of how…India colonized the West and brought it a step closer to genuine multiculturalism.” In doing so, Kumar “lyrically evokes the standard diasporic themes of abandonment, exile and romantic nostalgia for a ‘home’ left behind."
- Husband of a Fanatic: A Personal Journey Through India, Pakistan, Love, and Hate (2005) explores “a series of journeys over the India-Pakistan border and the interior boundaries of love and hate, as well as to South Africa, New York and London.” In this nonfiction work, “Kumar tells densely wrought stories about forbidden love, his own marriage, tragi-comic border tensions and the poisonous issue of conversion.”
- In Home Products (published in the U.S. under the title Nobody Does the Right Thing, 2010) Kumar examines the “question of how art, which is a representation of life, also impacts life, triggering memories, provoking connections and being assimilated till it practically becomes a home product.”
- A Foreigner Carrying in the Crook of His Arm A Tiny Bomb (2010) “is about the ordinary men and women, brown-skinned in general and Muslim in particular, who have had their lives upended by America’s enraged security apparatus.”
- A Matter of Rats: A Short Biography of Patna (2014) takes the reader through Kumar’s hometown of Patna, exploring the city’s storied past and present reality. It represents “an insider’s alternative to the scornful narratives of Patna made popular by Western writers.”
- Lunch with a Bigot: The Writer in the World (2015) is an essay collection of “intimate stories about people who have not been often represented in our media.” Kumar’s essays complicate “our desire that others be recognizable, familiar, and our relations with them comfortable, and instead seek parallactic intimacies — he writes stories about others about whom we’ve been silent, and about the ‘borders of the self.’”
- Immigrant, Montana (2018), first published in India as The Lovers (2017) “recalls the youthful romantic adventures of Kailash, an Indian-born writer and scholar.” Purposefully blurring the line “between the author’s life and that of his fictional protagonist,” this novel “‘is a work of fiction as well as nonfiction,’” in Kumar’s own words.
- In Every Day I Write the Book: Notes on Style (2020), Kumar provides “a guide for academic writers that is also relevant to anyone who cares about fine prose.” In this “handbook on style and form,” he offers advice for how to make scholarly writing more engaging, creative, and imbued with the writer’s unique style.
- In A Time Outside This Time (2021), “Satya is an Indian writer based in New York, enjoying a residency for artists in Italy… His resilient pursuit of social norms as defined in a post-truth world results in him building a plotline for his book.”
- The Blue Book: A Writer's Journal (2022) is “a memory book with hybrid literary and artistic parentage” in which “words become paintings, and paintings turn into a beguiling literary anthropology of ‘reality and surreality’ that leaves us stunned.”
- In The Yellow Book: A Traveller's Diary (2023), Kumar “designs smooth vignettes that circulate around indicia of contemporary interests,” including “the Covid pandemic, the grievous assault on Salman Rushdie, Kumar’s writing and London-strolling classes.”
- The Green Book: An Observer’s Notebook (2024) is the final installment of Kumar’s trilogy on his art and personal journal entries, and is “a groundbreaking account of his creative process" that "emphasizes the importance of journaling for self-discovery.”
- My Beloved Life (2024) is “a vivid exploration of some of life’s most painful experiences—the catastrophic breakup of a marriage, political violence, and social crisis, the death of one’s parents—and how we manage to go on afterward.”

=== Bibliography ===
==== Books ====
- No Tears for the N.R.I., Writers Workshop, 1996. ISBN 978-81-7189-893-0
- Passport Photos, University of California Press, 2000. ISBN 978-0-520-21816-1
- Bombay–London–New York, Routledge, 2002. ISBN 978-0-415-94210-2
- Husband of a Fanatic: A Personal Journey Through India, Pakistan, Love, and Hate, The New Press, 2005. ISBN 978-1-56584-926-6
- Home Products (published in the U.S. under the title Nobody Does the Right Thing), Duke University Press, 2010 and Picador India, 2007. ISBN 978-0-8223-4670-8
- A Foreigner Carrying in the Crook of His Arm A Tiny Bomb, Durham, NC: Duke University Press Books, 2010. ISBN 978-0-8223-4562-6
- A Matter of Rats: A Short Biography of Patna, Duke University Press Books, 2014. ISBN 978-0-8223-5704-9
- Lunch with a Bigot: The Writer in the World, Duke University Press Books, 2015. ISBN 978-0-8223-5911-1
- Immigrant, Montana, Knopf, 2018. ISBN 978-0-525-52075-7 (first published in India as The Lovers, Aleph, 2017. ISBN 978-93-86021-00-7)
- Every Day I Write the Book: Notes on Style, Duke University Press Books, 2020. ISBN 978-1-4780-0627-5
- A Time Outside This Time, Knopf, 2021. ISBN 9780593319017
- The Blue Book: A Writer's Journal, HarperCollins India, 2022. ISBN 978-93-5489-374-2, a book of drawings and diary entries
- The Yellow Book: A Traveller's Diary, HarperCollins India, 2023. ISBN 978-93-5699-603-8
- The Green Book: An Observer’s Notebook, HarperCollins India, 2024. ISBN 9789365692754
- My Beloved Life, Knopf, 2024. ISBN 978-0-593-53606-3

==== Edited works ====
- Class Issues: Pedagogy, Cultural Studies, and the Public Sphere, New York University Press, 1997. ISBN 9780312218669 (edited volume of essays on radical teaching.)
- Poetics/Politics: Radical Aesthetics for the Classroom, St Martin’s Press, 1999. ISBN 9780312218669 (edited volume of essays on radical aesthetics and pedagogy)
- The Humour and the Pity, Buffalo Books in Association with British Council, 2002. ISBN 9788187890027 (edited volume of essays on V.S. Naipaul)
- World Bank Literature, University of Minnesota Press, Dec. 16, 2002. ISBN 9780816638376 (edited volume of essays on global economies and literature)
- Away: The Indian Writer as an Expatriate, Routledge, Nov. 13, 2003. ISBN 978-0415968973 (edited volume of essays)

=== Awards and fellowships ===
Kumar was awarded the Cullman Center Fellowship at the New York Public Library for 2023-2024, and was the Mary Ellen von der Heyden Fellow. In 2016, Kumar was awarded a Guggenheim Fellowship for General Nonfiction, as well as a Ford Fellowship in Literature from United States Artists. He has been awarded writing residences by Yaddo, MacDowell Colony, the Rockefeller Foundation at Bellagio, the Norman Mailer Writing Center, Writers Omi at Ledig House, the Lannan Foundation, and the Hawthornden Foundation. Additionally, he has received research fellowships from the NEH, Yale University, SUNY-Stony Brook, Dartmouth College, and University of California-Riverside. Currently, he serves on the board of the Corporation of Yaddo and is a trustee at PEN America.
