= St. Xavier's College of Education =

Autonomous College in Bihar

Coordinates: 25°38′42.06″N 85°6′4.9″E

St. Xavier's College of Education (Autonomous)
- Motto: For God And Country
- Type: Private
- Established: 1988; 38 years ago
- Affiliations: Aryabhatta Knowledge University
- Religious affiliation: Jesuit (Roman Catholic)
- Principal: Prof.(Fr.) Ignatius Topno, S.J.
- Campus: Urban
- Address: Digha Ghat P.O., Patna- 800 011 Bihar, India
- Nickname: SXCE Patna
- Website: sxcepatna.edu.in

St. Xavier's College of Education (Autonomous), Patna (SXCE Patna or SXCE), co-educational, self-financed, Catholic minority institution in Patna, Bihar, India. Founded in 1988 by the Patna Province of the Society of Jesus, it is named after St. Francis Xavier, a Spanish Jesuit saint of the 16th century and Catholic missionary to India.

== History ==
The Jesuits first came to Patna in 1919, and in early 1930 were approached to set up a school in the city of Patna. Fr. Loesch with the assistance of Fr. Marshall D. Moran opened a Cambridge school serving the people of Patna and Bihar. Later, in 1940, St. Xavier's High School, Patna, was built at Gandhi Maidan Marg. Then in November 1988 the Jesuits founded St. Xavier’s College of Education, Patna.

== Academics ==
The college offers Ph.D. (Education) and two-years undergraduate and postgraduate programmes in Bachelor of Education and Master of Education from Aryabhatta Knowledge University. St. Xavier’s College of Education is approved by the National Council for Teacher Education (NCTE). The college is also accredited with "A" Grade by the National Assessment and Accreditation Council (NAAC).

== Facilities ==
The campus covers about 10117.5 sq.m. at Digha in Patna. The main building housing offices and classrooms was completed in 1990, and was extended in 2010. The college's main facility includes laboratories for Physical Science, Language, Psychology, Education, Technology, and Biology, as well as multipurpose halls, a library with over 13,000 books, and two computer labs. The college provides boarding facilities and includes a gymnasium and outdoor fields, and also a canteen.

== Alumni ==
St. Xavier's College of Education Alumni Association (SXCEAA), formed in 2003, sponsors many activities. In 2015 the president of the association was Marie Ann D’Cruz.

== Sister institutions ==
The sister institutions of St. Xavier's College in Patna are

- St. Xavier's High School, Patna
- St. Michael's High School, Patna
- St. Xavier's College, Patna

== See also ==
- List of Jesuit sites
