= Manas Bihari Verma =

Indian aeronautical scientist (1943–2021)

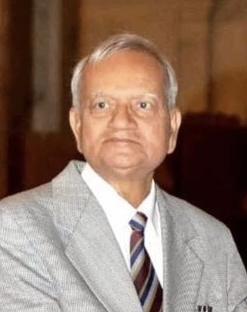
- Verma in 2018
- Born: 29 July 1943; Darbhanga, Bihar Province, British India
- Died: 4 May 2021 (aged 77); Darbhanga, India
- Resting place: Darbhanga, India
- Education: Bihar College of Engineering; Calcutta University
- Awards: Padma Shri

Manas Bihari Verma (29 July 1943 – 4 May 2021) was an Indian aeronautical scientist instrumental in the development of the light combat aircraft, Tejas. In 2018, he was conferred the Padma Shri civilian honour by the President of India. After his retirement he launched Mobile Science Lab aimed at promoting science education in Bihar.

== Early life ==
Dr Manas Bihari Verma was born in Kayastha family to Yashoda Devi and Anand Kishore Lal Das on 29 July 1943 in the Bour village of Ghanshyampur block, situated in Darbhanga district, Bihar Province, British India. He had three brothers and four sisters. He was related to Braj Kishore Verma Manipadam, a celebrated Maithili literary writer. He completed his schooling from Jawahar High School in Madhepur. Later, he studied in Bihar College of Engineering, Patna, and Calcutta University.

== Career ==
Verma worked as a scientist at the Defence Research Development Organization (DRDO) in the aeronautical stream for 35 years. He worked in various aeronautical departments established in Bangalore, New Delhi, and Koraput. Later, he was made responsible for the design of the Tejas aircraft mechanical system. He was part of the design team of the Light Combat Aircraft (LCA) in the Aeronautical Development Agency (ADA). He led the team responsible for the full-scale engineering development of the Tejas aircraft. He was given the 'Scientist of the Year' award by former PM Atal Bihari Vajpayee and 'Technology Leadership Award' by former PM Manmohan Singh respectively. He retired from the ADA in 2005 as the Director of the Aeronautical Development Agency.

In 2018, the Government of India conferred the Padma Sri award to him for his exemplary contributions in the field of aeronautical engineering.

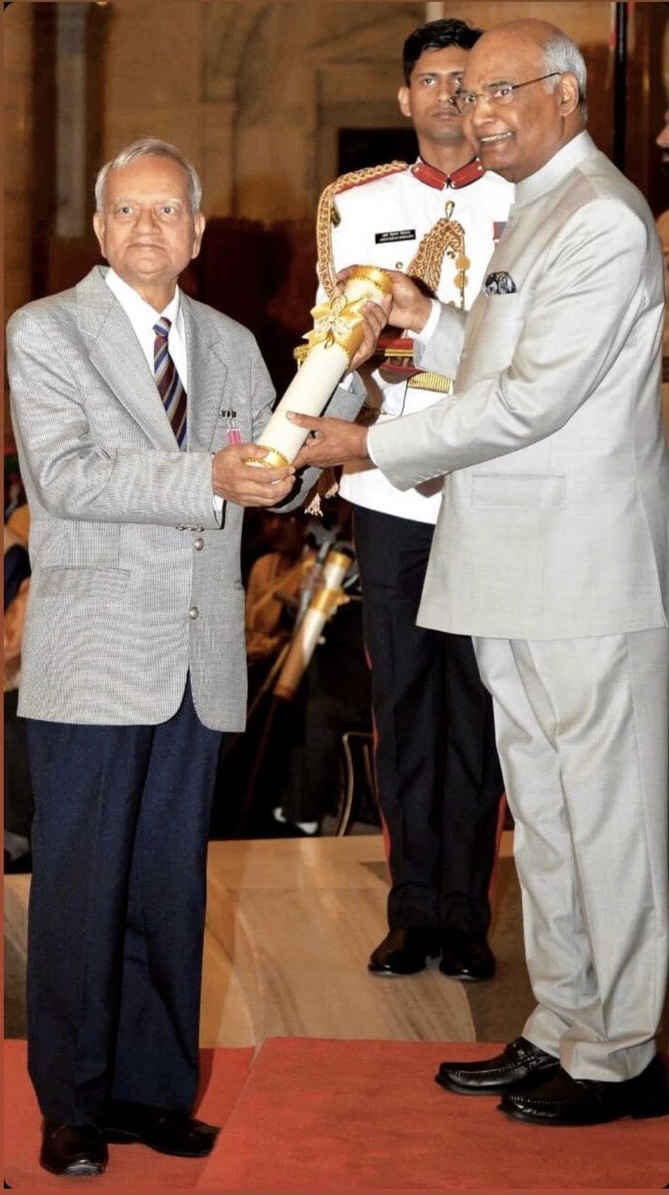
Dr. Manas receiving Padma Shri award from President Ramnath Kovind

After retirement, he returned to his native village of Bour and was involved in imparting science and computer knowledge to Dalit children in the areas of Supaul, Madhubani, and Darbhanga, through the Viksit Bharat Foundation started by Verma. Through his Mobile Science Lab project, launched in 2010, a team of science and computer instructors would visit schools to demonstrate scientific experiments and impart computer learning. The teaching was done through the 'Lab in Box' (LIB) programme supported by IBM.

== Death ==
Verma died from a heart attack at 11:45 pm on 4 May 2021, at his home in the K M Tank locality of Laheriasarai, Darbhanga in Bihar, aged 77 years.
