= Aryabhatta Knowledge University =

Public university in Patna, Bihar, India

Coordinates: 25.5925°N 85.1350°E

- Logo of Aryabhatta Knowledge University
- Other names: AKU, Patna
- Motto: Satyadharmāya dṛṣṭaye (Sanskrit)
- Motto in English: For the vision of truth and righteousness
- Type: Public State University
- Established: 19 March 2010; 16 years ago
- Academic affiliations: UGC, AIU
- Budget: ▲₹33.23 crore
- Chancellor: Governor of Bihar
- Vice-Chancellor: Sharad Kumar Yadav
- Location: Patna, Bihar, India
- Campus: Urban
- Language: English; Hindi
- Website: akubihar.ac.in

Aryabhatta Knowledge University (AKU), Patna is a collegiate public state university located in Mithapur, Patna, Bihar, India. It is named after the Father of Indian Mathematics and astronomer Aryabhatta.

As per 2022-23, it is a statutory requirement for colleges offering any professional programs except medical sciences and engineering in the state to be affiliated with the university. It also has four schools:

- Centre for Geographical studies.
- Centre for River studies.
- Centre for Journalism and Mass Communication.
- Patliputra School of Economics.

== Campus ==
The university operates from its own office in Mithapur, Patna.

== History ==
The university was established on 19th of March 2010 by the Government of Bihar through the Aryabhatta Knowledge University Act, 2008. The first Chancellor of AKU was Governor Devanand Konwar. It was established for the development and management of education and infrastructure related to professional and general higher-education institutions, management, law, journalism and allied professional education in Bihar. It has its jurisdiction over entire state of Bihar

=== Affiliated colleges ===
In the session 2022–23, university has 33 educational colleges, 8 community colleges and 11 vocational colleges.

=== Educational colleges ===
- St. Xavier's College of Education, Patna
- Amaltas College of Education, Rohtas
- Trident BEd College, Giddha
- Hari Narain Singh Institute of Teacher's Education, Sasaram
- Kingway Technical Institute, Kaimur
- Radhakrishnan College of Education, Patna
- Maitreya College of Education & Management, Vaishali
- Harakhdeo Singh College of Education Ramanuj Bag, Nalanda
- Maa Aranya Devi BEd College, Bhojpur
- R.L. Mahto Institute of Education, Samastipur
- Mundeshwari College for Teacher Education, Patna
- Raj Mata Madhuri Devi Teacher’s Training College, Khagaria
- Ganga Global Institute of Teacher Education, Begusarai
- S. S. College of Teacher Education, Patna
- Surendra BEd Teacher Training College
- Himalaya Teacher’s Training College, Patna
- Veerayatan BEd College, Nalanda
- Mamta Institute of Education, Siwan
- Acharya Sudarshan BEd College, Sitamarhi
- KGI School of Education, Patna
- Janardan Prasad Singh Teachers Training College, Saran
- Kamla Bhubneshwer BEd College, Begusarai
- Deshratna Rajendra Prasad Shikshak Prashikshan Mahavidyalaya, Patna
- Bhagawati Singh Memorial BEd Mahavidyalaya, Bhabhua
- R.S. Sharda Devi Education College, Vaishali
- Government Women's College, Gardanibagh
- Tarkeshwar Narayan Agrawal Teacher's Training College, Harigaon
- Chanakya Foundation, Patna
- Tapeshwar Singh Teacher's Training College, Bhojpur
- Maryada Purushotam College of Education, Buxar
- Bhuwan Malti Teachers Training College, Motihari
- Gyan Prakash Swami Vivekanand Teacher's Training College, Khushrupur
- Gautam College of Education, Chapra
- Indrakali Ramjee Singh BEd College, Gopalganj

=== Vocational & professional college ===
The Vocational and Professional colleges under Aryabhatta Knowledge University include.

- Ambedkar Institute of Higher Education, Danapur, Patna
- Cimage Professional College, Patna
- IMPACT, Patna
- Indian Institute of Business Management, Patna
- International School of Management, Patna
- Lalit Narayan Mishra Institute of Economic Development & Social Change, Patna
- Magadh Professional Institute, Rupaspur-Digha Nahar Road, Patna
- Adwaita Mission Institute of Technology, Banka
- Ganga Global Institute of Management Studies, Begusarai
- Moti Babu Institute of Technology, Forebesganj
- Mamta Institute of Education, Siwan
- Vidya Vihar Institute of Technology, Purnia

== See also ==
- Education in Bihar
- Education in India
- List of educational institutions in Patna
- List of institutions of higher education in Bihar
