= Baldwin Academy =

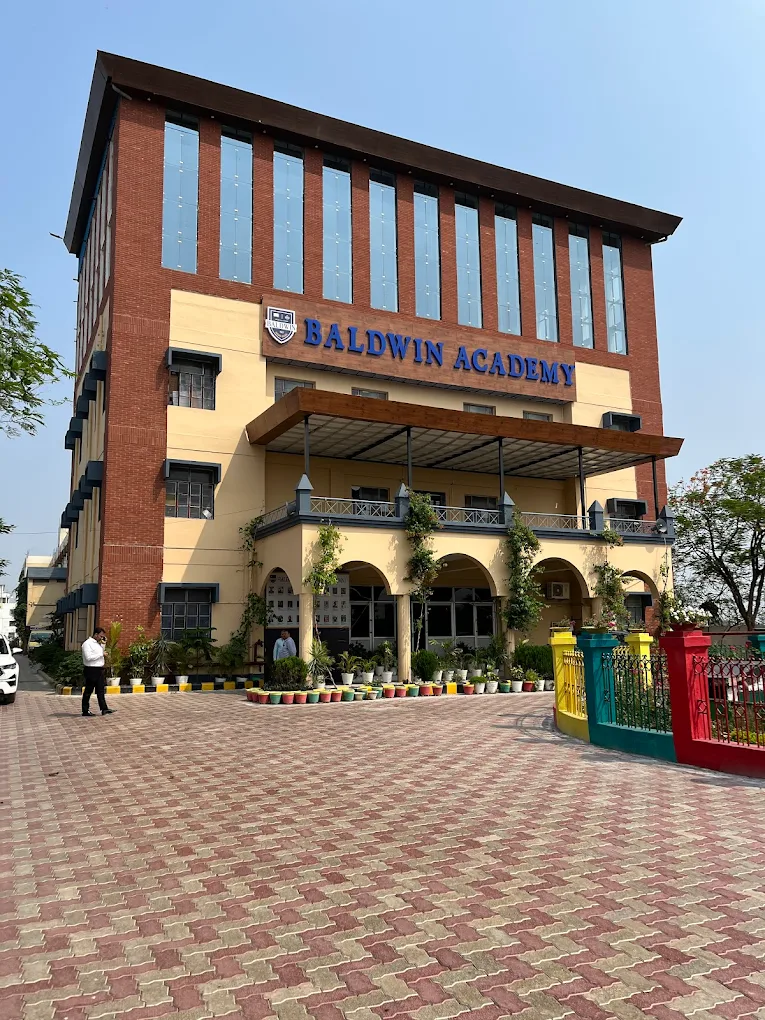

Location
- Patna Bypass Road, Dhawalpura South, Paijawa, Patna; Bihar, 800009; India; 25°33′48″N 85°13′16″E

Information
- School type: Senior secondary
- Motto: Deeds Not Words
- Established: 1987
- School board: CBSE
- Session: April–March
- Director: Prabhas Kumar
- Principal: Rajiv Ranjan Sinha
- Gender: Boys and Girls
- Classes: Nursery to 12
- Language: English
- Campus size: 4 acres (1.6 ha)
- Sports: Carrom, chess, Taekwondo, table tennis, lawn tennis, basketball, yoga, badminton, volleyball, handball etc.
- Affiliation: CBSE, New Delhi
- Website: www.baldwinsociety.in

Baldwin Academy is a senior secondary, co-educational, English medium school located in Patna, Bihar, India. It is affiliated to the Central Board of Secondary Education, New Delhi. It was founded in 1987 by Prabhas Kumar and Dr. Rajiv Ranjan Sinha, and is managed by the Baldwin Academy Society. The school was named after Saint Baldwin. It started as primary school and later went on to become a senior secondary school.

The school has been affiliated to the Central Board of Secondary Education, New Delhi since 1997. The principal of the school is Dr. Rajiv Ranjan Sinha, who is also the CBSE city coordinator for Patna.

== Administration ==
- Principal - Dr. Rajiv Ranjan Sinha
- Director - Prabhas Kumar
