= Rajasthan College of Engineering for Women =

Rajasthan College of Engineering for Women, Jaipur
- Motto: योगः कर्मशु कोशलम् (Diligence leads to Excellence)
- Type: Engineering Institution
- Established: 2002
- Affiliations: Rajasthan Technical University
- Chairperson: Smt. Beena Singh
- Principal: Dr. Arihant Khicha
- Location: Jaipur, Rajasthan, India
- Campus: Urban
- Acronym: RCEW

Established in year 2002, Rajasthan College of Engineering for Women is promoted by Chandrawati Education Society with the aim to enable the girl empowerment through technical education which will help students to unchain barriers to reach greater heights. The college is located very close to National Highway No. 8 on Jaipur-Ajmer segment. It is 12 km from the railway station and central bus stand and 15 km from the airport.

== Departments ==
UNDER GRADUATE

=== CSE ===
The department was established in the academic year 2002 offering a 4-year BTech & 2-year MTech Degree Program admitted through the single window Admission procedure of Rajasthan Technical University (RTU), Kota. The Department was NBA (National Board of Accreditation) Accredited in March 2012.

=== ECE ===
The Department of Electronics & Communication is an eminent part of Rajasthan College of Engineering For Women RCEW), Jaipur, which focuses on technically developing the students' minds so that they can emerge as pragmatic engineers. The department was established in the academic year 2002 offering a 4-year BTech & 2-year MTech Degree Program admitted through the single window Admission procedure of Rajasthan Technical University (RTU), Kota. The Department was NBA (National Board of Accreditation) Accredited in March 2012.

=== EE ===
The Electrical Engineering Department at RCEW, Jaipur has been active since its inception in 2002. The department has U.G. Programme with about 200 undergraduates Students. The Post Graduate Programme (Electrical Power System) with about 14 Post Graduate Students. The department of Electrical Engineering has well equipped Labs includes Basic Electrical Engineering Lab, Electrical Measurement Lab, Circuit Analysis Lab, Power system Lab, Electrical Machines Lab, Electrical Drives lab, Project Lab etc.

=== Post graduate ===
==== MCA ====
Masters in Computer Application (MCA) Program was introduced at Rajasthan College of Engineering for Women, Jaipur in the academic year 2008 – 09, with a sanctioned intake of 60 students.

==== MBA ====
The full-time MBA (Masters of Business Administration) program is focused on Management Systems and is designed to be completed in two years. Apart from the specialized compulsory course in the focus area, the students have choice for functional area specialization in Finance, Marketing, and Human resource.

=== Research ===
- PhD

== Campus ==
Spread over a stretch of land, the campus is equipped with facilities comprising: laboratories, stocked library, digital library, gymnasium, hostel, mess, indoor games, and outdoor games.
