= School of Creative Learning =

- Bihar, India
- Abbreviation: SCL
- Formation: 1997
- Type: School
- Purpose: Education, Overall Development of Child
- Headquarters: Patna, Bihar, India
- Coordinates: 25.6117°N 85.0216°E
- Principal: Mridula Prakash
- Affiliations: Central Board of Secondary Education CBSE
- Staff: 50+
- Website: www.creativelearning.in

School of Creative Learning or Creative Learning School is a school run by the Association for Promotion of Creative Learning, a non-profit organisation registered under Societies Registration Act, 1860. It has been established with the objective of promoting creative learning in society in 1997.

SCL is affiliated to Central Board for Secondary Education (CBSE) till Standard 12th (K-12). It transacts CBSE curricula with creative learning methodology. The School was established on 11 February 1997 and has over 600 students (as of 2011).

SCL is located on Danapur Cantt Shivala Road at the outskirts of Patna, the capital of Bihar in India. (25.6117°N 85.0216°E) The location was chosen due to its importance in the field of education in ancient India. The great mathematician-astronomer Aryabhatta, who undertook several pioneering studies in Mathematics, Astronomy and Science and is credited with giving the world the concept of zero and the approximation of pi in 499 CE itself, is believed to have established a study centre at Khagaul, a place near the school.

== Creative learning ==
APCL developed a new Teaching/Learning Methodology (TLM) called "Creative Learning" which aims at developing creativity of a person. The school believes that "Every Child is born Creative". The basic purpose of the system is to develop the child's intrinsic learning processes. Based on the information processing model of learning, it attempts to develop seven basic competencies called Core Creative Competencies (C3): concentration, power of observation, memory, thinking, imagination, emotional management, and communication/expression power. The system is based in traditional Yogic cultural practices, but integrates them into modern learning systems.

The content of learning is selected specifically for each child, taking into account the child's personality, family, and social environment. Through the use of monitoring and evaluation, the materials are regularly adapted to the child's strengths and weaknesses.

The system used by the school is published in the book Creative Learning: A Handbook for Teachers & Trainers, by Shri Vijoy Prakash, Founding Executive President of APCL.

=== Creativity Olympiad ===
Creativity Olympiad is a unique event in which participants competitively engage in activities related to development of core creative competencies identified in Creative Learning - concentration, imagination, memory, thinking, power of observation and communication. The 22 events held across five categories have activities ranging from Yogic exercises to art and music. The month-long Olympiad is held annually at the School of Creative Learning. It has been held at the school in 2009, 2010 and 2011.

== The Ritu Sinha Knowledge Centre for Creative Learning ==
In December 2009, the Ritu Sinha Knowledge Centre for Creative Learning was inaugurated, which serves as the resource centre for various educational and research activities being carried out at the school. The centre is equipped with a library, computer centre, conference hall, health centre and exhibition hall. The Centre has hosted several conferences, seminars and workshops. The centre has been developed in collaboration with Ritu Sinha Charitable Fund (USA).

== SAIL laboratory block ==
Steel Authority of India Limited funded the construction of the laboratories at the school. SCL has laboratories for creative learning, social science, language, physics, chemistry, and biology.
