= St. Michael's High School, Patna =

St. Michael's High School

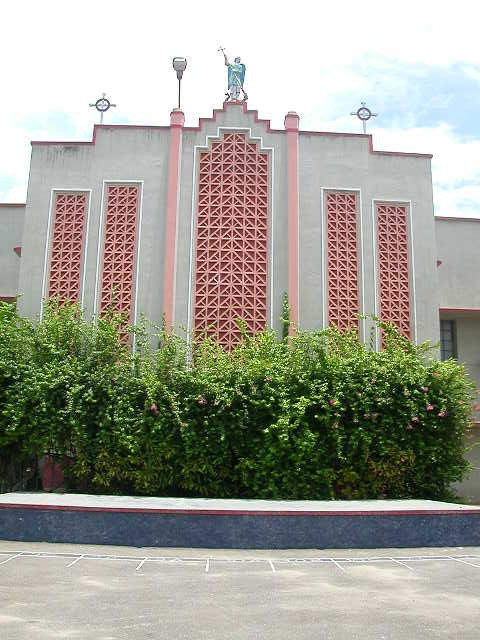
- Administrative building and assembly stage

Location
- Bankipur-Danapur Road; Patna, Bihar, 800011; India; 25°38′40″N 85°6′9″E

Information
- School type: Private secondary school
- Motto: Latin: Pro Deo et Patria (For God and Country)
- Religious affiliation: Roman Catholic
- Denomination: Jesuits
- Patron saint: Michael the Archangel
- Established: 1858; 168 years ago
- Founder: Bishop Anastasius Hartmann
- Status: Active
- Sister school: St. Xavier's High School, Patna; St. Joseph's Convent High School
- Authority: Central Board of Secondary Education
- Session: April–March
- School code: 330004
- Rector: Fr. Norbert Menezes, S.J.
- Principal: Fr. A. Christu Savarirajan S.J.
- Campus Director: Fr. Mathew PI, S. J.
- Faculty: 122
- Enrollment: 4800
- Average class size: 50-60 students
- Language: English, Hindi
- Hours in school day: 6-7 hrs
- Campuses: Digha, Patna
- Campus: Urban
- Campus size: 21.55 acres (8.72 ha)
- Houses: Blue; Green; Red; Gold
- Sports: Football,handball, cricket, table-tennis, carrom, chess, throw ball, karate, yoga, badminton, swimming, kho-kho, kabaddi, basketball, track events
- Nickname: Michaelites
- Publication: Theatrum[21]
- Website: www.stmichaelspatna.edu.in

St. Michael's High School, Patna, also referred to as SMHS Patna or SMHS for short, is a private, Roman Catholic, co-educational high school in the Digha neighborhood of Patna, Bihar, India.

Established in 1858 initially as an orphanage, it is one of the oldest schools in the state of Bihar, and is currently managed by the Patna Province of the Society of Jesus. It was founded by the first Bishop of Patna, Msgr. Anastasius Hartmann.

The current principal is Fr. A. Christu Savarirajan, SJ who took over from Edison J. Armstrong who took charge in January 2023. The school's patron saint is Saint Michael the Archangel. The school authority is the Central Board of Secondary Education in New Delhi.

== History ==
In 1854 Monsignor Zuber, Vicar Apostolic of Patna, purchased the land where the school stands intending to form a community of native Christians. The Indian Rebellion of 1857 destroyed his plans and the place was left without any residents. In 1858, when order was restored, Anastasius Hartmann opened the building as an orphanage for children who became orphans during the rebellion. More buildings were added and the institution gradually grew to become a large boarding house and orphanage combined.

In 1894, the management of the school was handed over to the Irish Christian Brothers (commonly known as Christian Brothers) under whose management it became one of the leading schools in Bengal. St Michael's became a high school and sent its first batch of four students to the high school examination in 1896. In 1907, Bengal District Gazetteers for Patna states the number of boys in the school at 283, including a large number of orphans. The staff consisted of six brothers and six secular teachers. During this period, the school received an annual government grant, regulated by the number of students enrolled. St. Michael's set up a volunteer cadet corps in 1893.

Since 1968, the school has been managed by the Jesuits of the Patna Province of the Society of Jesus, In 1988 the school's affiliation board changed from ICSE Board to the Central Board of Secondary Education (CBSE).

== Campus and infrastructure ==
The school is in Bankipur - Danapur Road (commonly known as Danapur Road), on the banks of the Ganges in the Digha neighborhood of Patna.

The central building complex houses classrooms, administrative offices, and an auditorium. The administrative offices including the principal's office are at the main entrance on the north gate of the building in front of the assembly ground. The main playground is west of the assembly ground and is used for annual parades as well as for games of cricket and football. The east playground is smaller and used by students to play games. The southeast section of the campus has table tennis boards and a handball wall. Indoor games such as carom, chess, and other board games are housed inside the main building in the playroom.

The auditorium is well-equipped with a PA system and has a stage for plays, performances, annual gatherings, and debate competitions.

The northwest section of the campus has a swimming pool with a diving board. Next to the pool is the school cafeteria. The school has a BEd college (St. Xavier's College of Education) on its campus to train teachers.

St. Michael's has two computer labs: one each for junior and senior students. The library is well equipped with reference books and caters to students of Class II and onward. The school has one language lab for the students from Class I to VIII and subject-specific labs for Physics, Chemistry, Biology, and Mathematics. A dispensary under the supervision of a trained nurse is in the school building to attend to any health care problems of students during school hours.

St. Michael's offers private, citywide transportation services for students and faculty through a bus service company.

== Academic ==
=== Affiliation ===
The institution is affiliated to the Central Board of Secondary Education, New Delhi. The school prepares its students for the All India Secondary School (Class IX-X) and the All India Senior School Certificate Examinations (Class XI-XII) conducted by the Central Board of Secondary Education, New Delhi.

=== Subjects ===
Below subjects are taught which are in accordance with the CBSE curriculum.

- English
- Hindi
- Sanskrit
- Mathematics
- Science (Physics, Chemistry, Biology)
- Value Education/Moral Science
- History, Geography, Civics
- Computer Studies/Science/Applications
- Economics/Economic Applications
- Commerce/Commercial Studies/Applications
- Business Studies
- Accounts

There are three streams for senior secondary classes XI and XII:

- Science Stream with Biology elective
- Science Stream with Economics elective
- Commerce Stream
- Science stream with IP (Informatics Practices) elective

=== Medium of instruction ===
Since 2010 all classes (I-XII) are taught in English.

Before 2010 the school followed Hindi medium for Primary sections (I-V), bilingual (Hindi and English) from Class VI-X (Social Studies and Moral Science in Hindi), and English medium at the +2 level.

== Grading system ==
St. Michael's follows the below grading system:

Scholastic-A

Marks Range	Grade	Grade Point
91-100	A1	10.0
81-90	A2	9.0
71-80	B1	8.0
61-70	B2	7.0
51-60	C1	6.0
41-50	C2	5.0
33-40	D	4.0
21-32	E1	
0-20	E2	

Scholastic-B

Marks Range	Grade	Grade Point
91-100	A+	10.0
81-90	A	9.0
71-80	B+	8.0
61-70	B	7.0
51-60	C	6.0

== School session ==
The school year is from April to March. Days are divided into eight periods with summer and winter timings. The order in which the classes meet varies from day to day.

== Uniform ==
=== Boys ===
Warm season:

- For Std. I-V: White shirt (half sleeve) with school monogram, black short pants, school belt, black socks and plain black leather shoes.
- For Std. VI-XII: White shirt (half sleeve) with school monogram, black trousers, school belt, black socks and plain black leather shoes.

Cold season:

- For Std. I-XII: White shirt (full sleeve) with school monogram, black trousers, school tie, solid navy blue sweaters without sleeves with V-neck and solid navy blue blazers with school monogram. School cap, muffler and gloves may be used.

=== Girls ===
Warm season:

- Std. I-VIII: Maroon-colored pleated and divided skirt (knee length), white shirt (half sleeve) with school monogram, black shoes and white socks. Hair ribbons must be maroon colored.
- Std. IX-XII: White salwar (plain), maroon kurta (knee length) with high neck collar, slit 8 to 10 inches, white dupatta (cotton), flat plain black shoes and white socks.

Cold season:

- Std. I-VIII: White shirt (full sleeve), white slacks, maroon-colored V-neck sweaters (half sleeve), maroon-colored blazer with school monogram and school tie.
- Std. IX-XII: Maroon-colored V-neck sweaters (half sleeve) and maroon-colored blazer with school monogram.

== Publications ==
The Theatrum is a monthly magazine of the school published by an editorial board consisting of teachers and students. It includes articles by students, events in the school, and student achievements.

The school publishes an annual yearbook featuring talks by the principal, rector, vice-principals, group photographs of all classes, photographs of office bearers and major events, and articles written by students, teachers, and alumni.

== Notable alumni ==
- Abhayanand
- Imtiaz Ali
- Jawed Ashraf, Ambassador of India to the Republic of France
- Shreemani, Ambassador of Kendriya Vidyalaya
- Bindeshwari Dubey, former Chief Minister of Bihar
- Syed Saba Karim
- Amitava Kumar
- Yashvardhan Kumar Sinha, Chief Information Commissioner of India, Former High Commissioner of India to the United Kingdom,
- Sushil Kumar Modi, Deputy Chief Minister of Bihar
- Rajiv Pratap Rudy
- Vikram Seth
- Arun Kumar Singh, IFS, former Indian ambassador to US
- Janmejaya Sinha, Chairman Boston Consulting Group (BCG) India
- Jayant Sinha, Minister of State for Civil Aviation

== See also ==
- List of Jesuit schools
- List of schools in Patna
- St. Xavier's High School, Patna
