= Anastasius Hartmann =

Venerable Anastasius Hartmann OFMCap
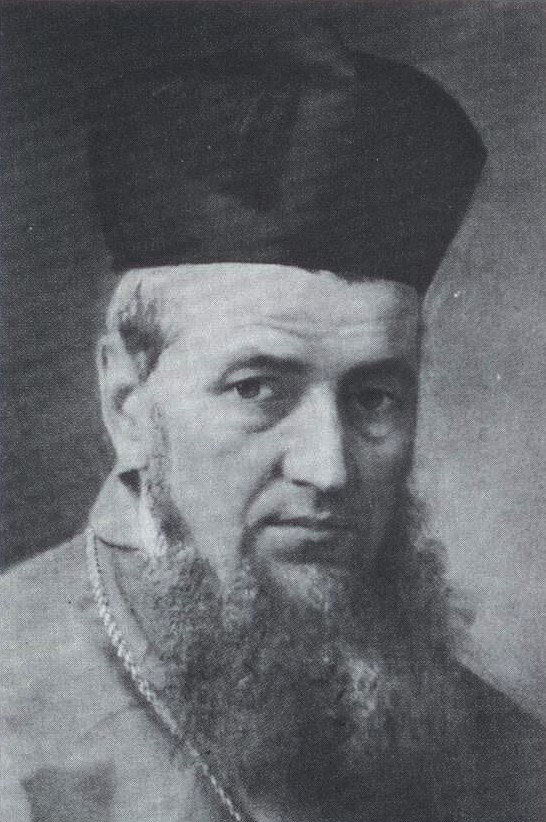
- Anastasius Hartmann 1850 Anastasius Hartmann in 1850
- Born: February 24, 1803; Altwis, Switzerland
- Died: April 24, 1886 (aged 83); St. Joseph's Orphanage Patna, India

Anastasius Hartmann, born as Joseph Alois Hartmann (* 24. February 1803 in Altwis, Lucerne, Switzerland; † 24. April 1886 in Kurji, Patna, India), was a Capuchin, a missionary in India, Titular Bishop and Vicar Apostolic of Patna and Bombay.

== Early life and education ==
He was born in Altwis in 1803, the son of peasants Joseph Hartmann and his wife Barbara Nietlisbach and baptised on the day after his birth in the local parish. He attended school in Solothurn and entered the novitiate of the Capuchins on 17 September 1821.

== Priesthood ==
In 1822 he professed his vows and was ordained a priest on September 24, 1825. After ordination, he worked as a chaplain in Luzern, then as novice master and teacher of theology at Fribourg until 1830. In 1839, he was sent to Solothurn to teach philosophy. During his teaching days, he started to feel a strong desire to go to the overseas missions. Permission was granted him to go as a missionary only after much hesitation from his superiors.

In September 1841, Hartmann left Switzerland and traveled to Rome on foot. In 1843, he was chosen to go with the Mission to Agra in India. After five months, he was reassigned to head the mission station in the town of Gwalior, in what is now Madhya Pradesh.

== Episcopate ==
In September 1845, Pope Gregory XVI made him the Vicar Apostolic of Patna and Titular Bishop of Derbe. The episcopal ordination was celebrated at Akbar's Church on 15 March 1846 by the local Apostolic Vicar Alessandro Borghi (bishop), Hartmanns bishopric consisted of seven parishes that were supervised by four priests. He worked with great zeal and under difficult conditions.

On July 9, 1854 Anastasius Hartmann became Vicar Apostolic of Bombay.

== Death ==
Hartmann died on 24 April 1866 in his residence at St. Joseph's Orphanage at Kurji (near Patna), from cholera. In life he had a reputation of holiness. He was buried in the (old) Cathedral of Patna.

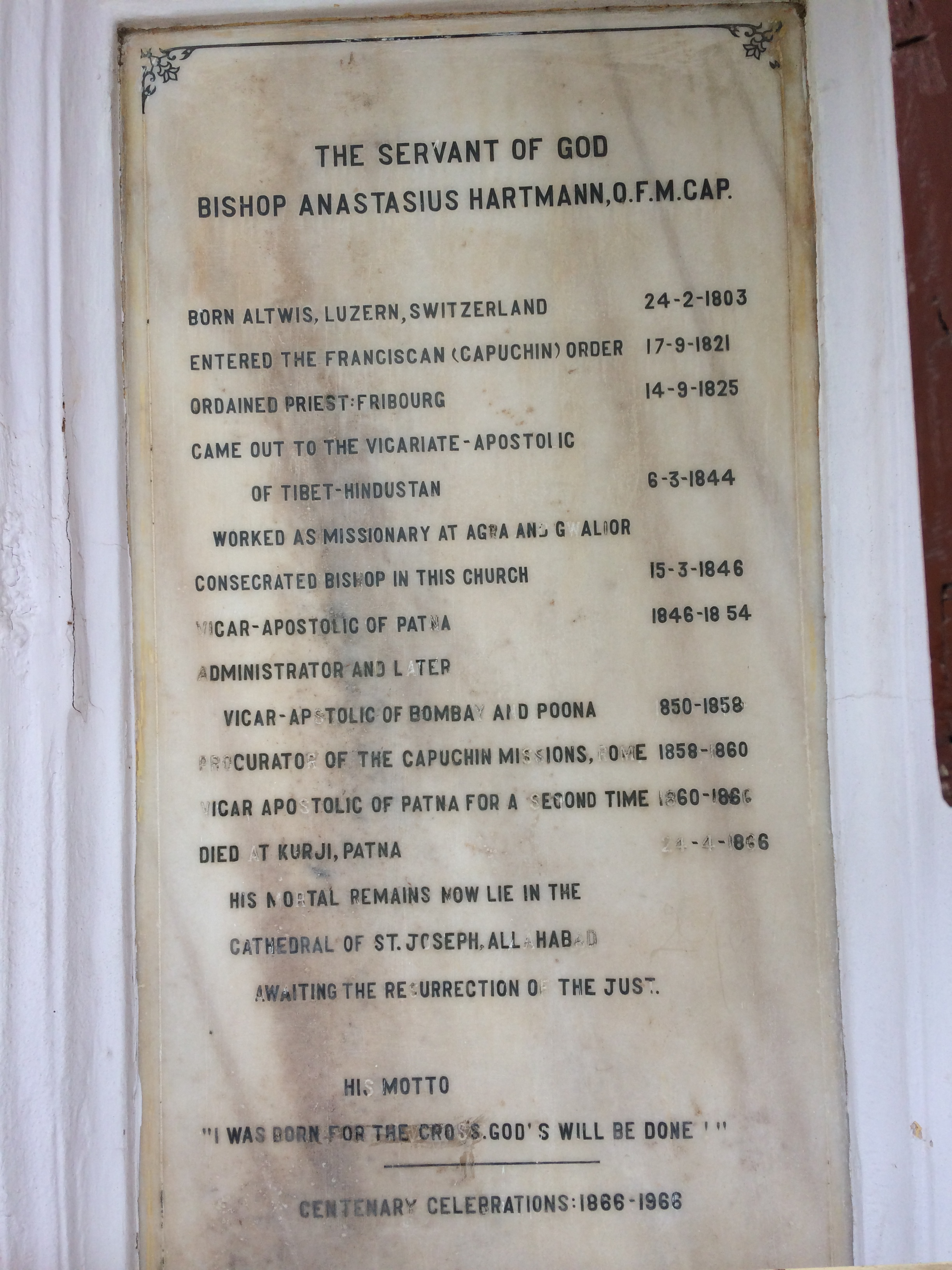
Stone tablet installed at Akbar's Church chronicling incidents in Hartmann's life

The cause for Hartmann's beatification was opened on 29 December 1909. Hartmann was declared venerable on 21 December 1998 by Pope John Paul II.
