= Don Bosco Academy, Patna =

Don Bosco Academy

Location
- Digha - Ashiana Road, PO Digha Ghat; Patna, Bihar 800011; India; 25°38′8.64″N 85°5′8.98″E

Information
- School type: Private school Co-Ed
- Motto: "For God and Country"
- Patron saint: Saint John Bosco
- Founded: 1973; 53 years ago
- Founder: Mr. Alfred george de rozario& Mrs. Dorothy Joy de Rozario
- Status: Active
- Sister school: Don Bosco Academy, McCluskiegunj, Ranchi-829208
- School board: Council for the Indian School Certificate Examination, New Delhi
- School district: Patna
- Authority: All India anglo Indian society
- Session: April–March
- School code: BI005/1983
- Director: Alfred de rozario
- Principal: Mary Alphonsa
- Treasurer/Bursar: Michael Daniell
- Gender: Co Education
- Average class size: 60
- Language: English
- Schedule type: Morning
- Hours in school day: 6-8 hrs
- Classrooms: 120
- Campuses: Digha, Patna; McCluskiegunj, Ranchi
- Campus size: 2 acres
- Houses: Red Green Blue and yellow
- Slogan: For God And Country
- Song: The School song
- Sports: Football, Volleyball, Cricket, Table-Tennis, Caroms, Chess, Throw ball, Karate, Yoga, Badminton
- Nickname: Boscoites
- Revenue: 3.6crore
- Affiliations: Council for the Indian School Certificate Examinations, National Cadet Corps (India)
- Website: https://www.donboscopatna.com

Don Bosco Academy, Patna is a co-educational institution located in the Digha area of Patna, India, established in 1973. It is affiliated to the Council for the Indian School Certificate Examinations, New Delhi – ICSE school (till 12th standard) since 22 July 1983. It was founded by Alfred de rozario and his wife Dorothy Joy de Rozario . It is now managed by the Don Bosco Anglo-Indian Educational Society, Danapur branch The current principal of the school Mrs. Mary Alphonsa.

== History ==
Don Bosco Academy, Patna was founded in the year 1973 by Alfred de Rozario and Dorothy de Rozario. In 1972 they set up a small hostel for school-going children in the name and style of Don Bosco Hostel. In 1973 they ventured to open an Anglo-Indian Co-educational school - Don Bosco Academy. Initially, it served as a feeder school for the other but few, established schools of the area.

In 1981 they handed over the control and management of the school to the Don Bosco Anglo-Indian Educational Society, a registered body. In 1982 Mr. Rozario joined as Principal of Don Bosco Academy. In 1983 the school obtained affiliation to the Council for the Indian School Certificate Examinations, New Delhi.

== Location ==
The main school campus is located in the Digha locality of Patna which caters to Std 5 to 12. A junior campus is located in the Patliputra locality of Patna which caters to students up to Std 4.

== School building and facilities ==
The school functions on its campus, measuring 2 acres (8,100 m²) at Digha, Patna. The school building is four-storied, with a playing field and an open-air stage. The school has science laboratories for Physics, Chemistry, and Biology, 1 multi-purpose hall and over 100 Classrooms, 2 computer laboratories which have no properly functioning keyboard, and a library. DBA organizes various intra−school and inter−school games every year.

== Curriculum ==
The school has been affiliated with the Council for the Indian School Certificate Examinations, New Delhi since July 1983 to conduct the Indian Certificate of Secondary Education Examination (ICSE-Year-10) and from 1999 to conduct the Indian School Certificate (Year-12) examination (ISC-12).
