= Loyola High School, Patna =

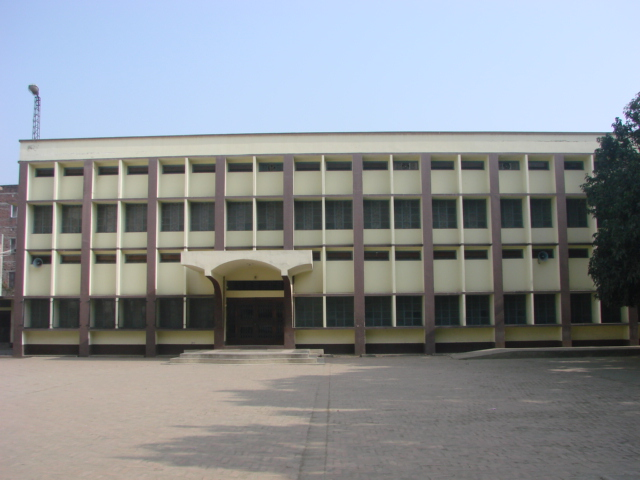
- Senior wing

Location
- Sadaqat Ashram, Kurji; Patna, Bihar, 800010; India; 25.6360°N 85.1082°E

Information
- Type: Private high school
- Motto: Daily Towards Progress
- Religious affiliation: Roman Catholic
- Established: 1969
- Founders: Montfort Brothers of St. Gabriel
- School board: Central Board of Secondary Education
- Oversight: Montfort Brothers of St. Gabriel
- Principal: Bro. Johnson V. George
- Gender: Co-educational
- Houses: Red; Blue; Green; Yellow
- Colours: Green and gold
- Publication: Spark
- Website: www.loyolapatna.edu.in

Loyola High School is a private, Roman Catholic, co-educational high school in Kurji, Patna, Bihar, India. It was established in 1969 and administered by the Montfort Brothers of St. Gabriel.

It is a co-educational school and the medium of instruction is English.

== History ==
Loyola High School was established in 1969 by the Montfort Brothers of St. Gabriel (Ranchi Province). It was originally a boys-only school.

Loyola High School was affiliated with the Bihar School Examination Board in 1976 but switched to the Central Board of Secondary Education (CBSE) in 1993.

The school expanded to include a senior secondary section on 1 April 2000 and again in 2005 to include a Montessori section, named Montfort Montessori Home.

== Notable alumni ==
Loyola has an alumni association and maintains a database of all former students. The primary objective of the association is to promote and maintain contact among the ex-students and to help the school with matters concerning its promotion, development and welfare.

- Akhansha Rani, TV anchor, writer, journalist and media personality and wifi material

== Gallery ==
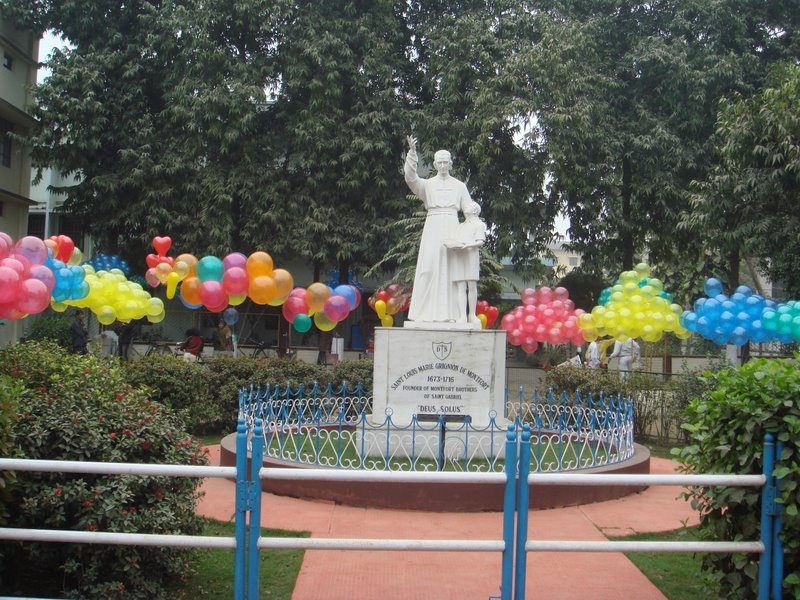
St.Montfort's statue in the school premises
