= St. Xavier's High School, Patna =

St. Xavier's High School
- Academia Sancti Xaverii

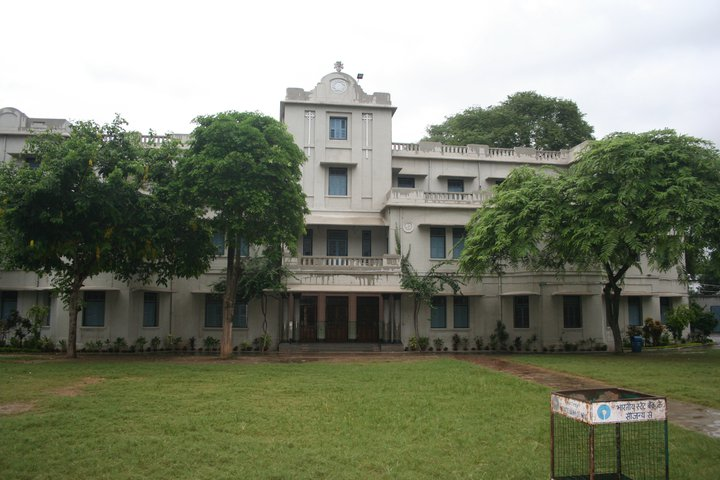
- Old building of St. Xavier's

Location
- West Gandhi Maidan Marg; Patna, Bihar, 800 001; India; 25°37′9″N 85°8′26″E

Information
- Type: Private primary and secondary day school
- Motto: Latin: Pro Deo Et Patria (For God and Country)
- Religious affiliation: Catholicism
- Denomination: Jesuits
- Patron saint: St. Francis Xavier
- Established: 17 January 1940; 86 years ago
- Founder: Marshall D. Moran
- School district: Patna district
- Session: April–March
- Rector: Fr. Joseph Sebastian S.J.
- Principal: Fr. Domichan, S.J.
- Staff: varies
- Teaching staff: 100
- Grades: LKG to XII
- Gender: Boys (1940–1999), Co-educational since 1999
- Age range: 4–17
- Enrolment: 2500 (2013)
- Average class size: 55–60
- Language: English; Hindi
- Hours in school day: 6–7 (approx)
- Campus type: Urban
- Houses: 4 (Leopards, Tigers, Lions and Panthers)
- Colors: Gold and blue
- Slogan: St. Xavier's School till the end, Xaverians for life Once a Xaverian, Always a Xaverian
- Song: हम सब साथी सेंट जेवियर्स के (Translation: We all companions of St. Xavier's)
- Nickname: SXS Patna
- Publication: Xavier Life
- Yearbook: Xavier Yearbook, Xavier's Life Annual
- Affiliations: CISCE; BSEB
- Website: www.stxavierspatna.in

St. Xavier's High School, Patna (often abbreviated as SXS Patna or SXHS), is a private Catholic primary and secondary school, located in the neighborhood of Gandhi Maidan in Patna, Bihar, India. Established in 1940, it is the oldest Jesuit school in the city of Patna and in the state of Bihar, established by missionaries from the American Chicago Province of the Society of Jesus. Founded in 1940, The independent, non-diocesan school is operated by the Patna Province of the Society of Jesus and located in the heart of the city of Patna.

== Etymology ==
it is named after St. Francis Xavier, a Spanish Jesuit saint of the 16th century, who travelled to India.

== Notable alumni ==
- Abhayanand, 48th D.G.P of the state of Bihar and famous educationalist
- Arup Roy Choudhury (1972): CMD, National Thermal Power Corporation
- Sandeep Das (1985): Tabla virtuoso
- Sujoy K. Guha (1955): biomedical engineer
- Syed Saba Karim (1982): former wicketkeeper, Indian Cricket Team, Board of Control for Cricket in India selector
- Tejendra Khanna (1954): Lt. Governor of Delhi
- Salman Khurshid (1970): Ex-Minister of External Affairs, Government of India, New Delhi
- Prakash Koirala: Nepalese politician; son of former Nepalese Prime Minister B P Koirala and father of actress Manisha Koirala
- Anjani Kumar (1984): 3rd Director General of Police, Telangana; former Commissioner of Police, Hyderabad City
- Nikhil Kumar (1955): Governor of Kerala; former IPS officer and Member of Parliament
- Sanjaya Lall (1956): development economist and Professor of Economics, Green College, Oxford University
- Manish Mehrotra (1990): award-winning chef
- Sujit Mukherjee (1944): teacher, author, translator, and publisher
- Jagat Prakash Nadda (1974): National President & Former National General Secretary, BJP & Former Cabinet Minister, Govt of Himachal Pradesh
- Shyam Saran (1961): former Foreign Secretary, Govt. of India
- Vikram Seth: writer
- Arun Kumar Singh (1971): Indian Envoy to France, earlier India's Deputy Ambassador in the US
- N. K. Singh (1956): Member of Rajya Sabha. ex IAS and Former Principal Secretary to the PM
- Dilip Sinha (1970): Ambassador and Permanent Representative of India to the UN in Geneva
- J. K. Sinha (1961): former Director General of India's Central Reserve Police Force
- Man Mohan Sinha (1948): Air Marshal, Indian Air Force
- Yashvardhan Kumar Sinha (1974): Central Information Commissioner and former Indian High Commissioner to Sri Lanka and the UK
- Shekhar Suman (1972): noted TV and Bollywood film actor and director

== See also ==
- List of Jesuit schools
- List of schools in Patna
- Violence against Christians in India
