= Singham (disambiguation) =

Singham is a 2011 Indian Hindi-language action film in the Cop Universe.

Singham may also refer to:

== Film ==
- Cop Universe, an Indian police film series created by Rohit Shetty, originating from the 2011 film
  - Singham 2 or Singham Returns, a 2014 Indian film, sequel to the 2011 film
  - Simmba, a 2018 Indian film, third installment in the series
  - Sooryavanshi, 2021 Indian film, fourth installment in the series
  - Singham Again, a 2024 Indian film, fifth installment in the series, sequel to the 2014 film
  - Little Singham, a 2018 Indian animated television series based on the 2011 film Singham
- Singham (2019 film), an Indian Punjabi-language action comedy film

== Names ==
- Singham (name), a surname or given name (including a list of people with the name) (transl. Lion in Tamil language)

== See also ==
- Singam (disambiguation)
- Simha (disambiguation)
- Sinhala (disambiguation)
- Singa (disambiguation)
- Singhania (disambiguation)
- Singh, an Indian surname
- Sinha, an Indian surname
