= Simha =

Simha may refer to:

== Surname ==
- Abhaya Simha (born 1981), Kannada film director and screenwriter
- Bobby Simha (born 1983), Indian film actor who has appeared in Tamil, Telugu and Malayalam language films
- C. R. Simha (1942–2014), Indian actor, director and dramatist
- Pratap Simha (born 1976), Indian politician
- Siva Simha Malla (AKA Shiva Simha, before 1583–1619), Malla Dynasty King from Kathmandu
- Vasishta N. Simha (born before 2011), Indian film actor who has appeared in Kannada and Tamil language films

== Given name ==
- Simha of Speyer (13th century), German rabbi and tosafist
- Simha Arom (born 1930), French-Israeli ethnomusicologist
- Simha Babah (1902–73), Israeli politician
- Simha Erlich (1915–83), Israeli politician
- Simha Flapan (1911–87), Israeli historian and politician
- Simha Tzabari (1913–2004), Israeli politician
- Simha Varman II (before 438–460), ruler from the Pallava Dynasty in what is now Karnataka and coastal Andhra Pradesh
- Simhana (r. 1210–1246), ruler of the Seuna dynasty of central India

== Films ==
- Keralida Simha, a 1981 Indian Kannada-language film
- Raja Malaya Simha, a 1959 Telugu and Tamil-language film
- Sahasa Simha, a 1982 Indian Kannada-language film
- Simha (film), a 2010 Telugu-language action film
- Simha Gharjane, a 1983 Indian Kannada-language film
- Simha Jodi, a 1980 Indian Kannada-language film
- Simha Swapna, a 1968 Indian Kannada-language film
- Simha Swapnam, a 1989 Telugu-language crime film
- Simhadriya Simha, a 2002 Indian Kannada-language action drama film

== Other uses ==
- Sahasa Simha Comics Series, a detective series in comics format published in English and Kannada
- Siṃha, a month in the Indian calendar
- Simha, a month in the Darian calendar

== See also ==
- Simhah, a Hebrew given name
- Simcha, a Hebrew given name
- Sinha, an Indian surname
- Sinh (disambiguation)
- Singam (disambiguation)
- Singham (disambiguation)
- Sinhala (disambiguation)
- Singa (disambiguation)
- Singhania (disambiguation)
- Singhana (disambiguation)
- Singh, an Indian surname
