= Singam (disambiguation) =

Singam may refer to:

== Film ==
- Singam (film series), an Indian police film series of Tamil films created by Hari and starring Suriya
  - Singam, a 2010 Indian Tamil-language film
  - Singam II, a 2013 Indian Tamil-language film
  - Si3 (film) or Singam 3, a 2017 Indian Tamil-language film
- Singam 123, a 2015 Indian Telugu-language film

== Names ==
- Singam (name), a surname or given name (including a list of people with the name) (transl. Lion in Tamil language)

== See also ==
- Singham (disambiguation)
- Simha (disambiguation)
- Sinhala (disambiguation)
- Singa (disambiguation)
- Singhania (disambiguation)
- Singh, an Indian surname
- Sinha, an Indian surname
