= Simcha (disambiguation) =

Simcha is Hebrew for happiness or joy.

Simcha may also refer to:

- A joyous event in Judaism, such as a wedding, bar mitzvah, or bat mitzvah is generally referred to as a simcha

Simcha may also refer to:

== People ==
- Reza Simkhah (born 1970), Iranian wrestler
- Simcha Barbiro (born 1967), Israeli actor
- Simcha Blass (1897–1982), Polish-Israeli engineer and inventor
- Simcha Bunim Alter (1898–1992)
- Simcha Bunim Cohen, Orthodox rabbi and author
- Simcha Bunim of Peshischa (1765–1827), key leader of Hasidic Judaism in Poland
- Simcha Dinitz (1929–2003), Israeli statesman and politician
- Simcha Eichenstein (born 1983), American politician
- Simcha Elberg (1915–1995), Talmudic scholar
- Simcha Felder, American politician
- Simcha Friedman (1911–1990), Israeli rabbi, educator, and politician
- Simcha Holtzberg (1924–1994), Israeli activist and Holocaust survivor
- Simcha Jacobovici (born 1953), Israeli journalist and documentary filmmaker
- Simcha Krauss (born 1937), rabbi
- Simcha Leiner (born 1989), American singer
- Simcha Lieberman (1929–2009), Israeli Talmudic scholar
- Simcha of Rome, a Jewish scholar and rabbi
- Simcha Rotem (1924–2018), Polish-Israeli veteran
- Simcha Shirman (born 1947), German born Israeli photographer
- Simcha Soroker (1928–2004), Israeli economist
- Simcha Weinstein (born 1975), English author and a rabbi
- Simcha Zelig Reguer (1864–1942), chief Rabbinical judge
- Simcha Zissel Halevi Levovitz (1908–2001), rabbi
- Simcha Zissel Ziv (1824–1898), early leader of the Musar movement
- Simcha Zorin (1902–1974), Jewish Soviet partisan commander in Minsk
- Simchah Roth (died 2012), Israeli rabbi and scholar

== See also ==
- Simchat Torah
- Happiness in Judaism
