= Umaidpur =

- Village
- Location within Bihar
- Coordinates: 25.779036°N 85.683340°E
- Country: India
- State: Bihar
- District: Samastipur
- Parliamentary constituency: Ujiarpur
- Assembly constituency: Morwa

Government
  - Body: Gram Panchayat

Population (2011)
  - Total: 1,960

Languages
  - Official: Hindi, English, Urdu, Maithali
- Time zone: UTC+5.30 (IST)
- PIN: 848121
- Area code: STD Code 06274
- Website: http://umaidpur.com/

Umaidpur is one of the villages of Morwa Dakshni Gram panchayat in Morwa (Vidhan Sabha constituency) in the Samastipur District of Bihar State, India.

== History ==
The current history can be traced back to the end of the 16th century when the area was a part of Singh Dynasty. During the Mughal period of 1571-1611, it was a huge empire and was ruled by Vikramjeet Singh of Sarmera. After his death (1614), the empire was destroyed due to civil war and heavy rainfall. Then in 1720 the descendants of Vikramjeet Singh of Sarmera established Sarmera Estate.

In 1770, the East India Company defeated Sarmera Estate and occupied this village. Then the ruler of Sarmera Estate, Bhim Lal Singh of Sarmera broke his estate into many small parts. Then this area became a part of the Presidency during the British Raj in 1778.

In the early 19th century, Umaidpur became a part of the newly created province of Bihar. The regional office was Harsingpur. T.I. Pal was the officer representative on behalf of the British. Throughout British rule, all the villages were part of the estates run by independent Zamindars, calling themselves a Raja, or directly ruled by the British Raj. The arid lands of Umaidpur was part of the Narhan Estate and the Jaintpur Estate, Muzaffarpur. The British cultivated indigo, sugarcane, poppy, and tobacco. Land revenue was collected with the help of Jeth Rayaits for the Tehsildar (revenue collector). Sukkan Roy was the Jeth Rayait for Narhan Estate, whereas Ram Pratap Roy was the Jeth Rayait for the Jaintpur Estate. Chullahai Hazari was the Brahil, whose responsibility was to inform villagers to come at the Jeth Rayait's house to pay land revenues.

When the British left India, they sold all their land possessions to Janak Kishore Prasad, including Harsinghpur Kothi. Presently, Umaidpur is the home of a former Mukhiya (1994-1996; 2001-2005), Sukhdeo Roy, the son of Sukkan Roy.

== Demographics ==
The total land of the Umaidpur village is around 300 bighas. In Samastipur district and Patna, one bigha is equivalent to 20 Kattha (1361 ft2 or 126.44 m2); one Kattha is sub-divided in 20 Dhur and one Dhur is approximately 68.06 ft^{2} (6.321 m^{2}). According to the 2011 Census of India, Umaidpur village (vilcode-236729) had around 329 households. The total population of the village is around 1,960 (male 1034 and female 926).

== Geography and climate ==
Time zone: IST (UTC+5:30)
Elevation / Altitude: 51 meters above sea level.

=== Location ===
Umaidpur is located in the far south-west of Samastipur District, bordered to the north and east by Naua Chak village, to the south by Jitwarpur Kumhara and in the west by Morwa. The post office is at Bhagwatpur. The PIN code is 848135 and the telephone STD code is 06274. The nearest banks are State Bank of India in Tajpur Morwa (006562) and Central Bank of India in Sarairanjan (280058).

=== Climate ===
Umaidpur experiences six distinct seasons. Typical summer months are from May to July, with maximum temperatures ranging from 35 °C to 45 °C. May and June are the warmest months in Umaidpur; although summer doesn't end until July. The monsoon lasts from August to September, with moderate/high rainfall and temperatures ranging from 15 °C to 35 °C. Winter begins in mid-January; the daytime temperature hovers around 28 °C (82 °F) while night temperature is below 15 °C for most of January and February.

Climate data for Umaidpur
Month	Jan	Feb	Mar	Apr	May	Jun	Jul	Aug	Sep	Oct	Nov	Dec	Year
Mean daily maximum °C (°F)	23.3 (73.9)	26.5 (79.7)	32.6 (90.7)	37.7 (99.9)	41.9 (107.4)	39.7 (103.5)	33.0 (91.4)	32.4 (90.3)	32.3 (90.1)	31.5 (88.7)	28.8 (83.8)	24.7 (76.5)	31.53 (88.75)
Mean daily minimum °C (°F)	7.2 (45.0)	11.6 (52.9)	16.4 (61.5)	22.3 (72.1)	25.2 (77.4)	26.7 (80.1)	26.2 (79.2)	26.1 (79.0)	25.7 (78.3)	21.8 (71.2)	12.7 (54.9)	6.9 (44.4)	19.65 (67.37)
Average precipitation mm (inches)	19 (0.7)	11 (0.4)	11 (0.4)	8 (0.3)	33 (1.3)	134 (5.3)	306 (12.0)	274 (10.8)	227 (8.9)	94 (3.7)	9 (0.4)	4 (0.2)	1,130 (44.5)
Source: Local Source & The Weather Channel Interactive, Inc. (Yahoo! Weather)

== Transportation ==
Umaidpur is well connected by buses and rails to different towns/cities of India.

=== Roads ===
Umaidpur is connected to various parts of India through national and state highways. The nearest major highways are:

- State Highways 49 (SH 49) connects it to Hajipur through Tajpur city. SH 49 starts from Hajipur and is connected further with Mahua, Vaishali and Hajipur through state highway.
- National Highway 28 connects it through Mushrigharari or Tajpur to Muzaffarpur, Motihari and Barauni.
- National Highway 103 connects it through Sarairanjan to Mushrigharari/Samastipur and Jandaha/Hajipur/Patna.

Bus services are available from Samastipur to Hajipur, Patna (80 km), Muzaffarpur (56 km), Chhapra (150 km), Siwan (203 km), Motihari (156 km), Bettiah, Ranchi and other cities.

=== Railways ===
The nearest railway stations are: Samastipur Junction railway station and Shahpur Patori Railway Station. One can travel from Umaidpur by bus, car or bicycle to Samastipur Junction railway station, Shahpur Patori Junction railway station or Muzaffarpur Junction railway station to board train for New Delhi, Howrah, Mumbai, Patna, Lucknow, Ranchi and other parts of India.

=== Air ===
The nearest airport, Lok Nayak Jayaprakash Narayan International Airport, Patna Airport, is 88.8 km (travel time is about 2hrs and 1 min) from Umaidpur.

== Education ==
Umaidpur village has a Primary and Upper Primary levels School. It is one of the old schools in this area. It is a co-educational school up to 8th class.

School Name: P.S. Umaidpur.
Sub-district/district/state: Morwa/Samastipur/Bihar
School address: Umaidpur, Morwa, Samastipur, Bihar - 848135
Public/private: Public
Year of establishment : 1965
Medium: Hindi

Based on India Census 2011, the female literacy rate is 42.76%, whereas the male literacy rate is 51.0%.

== Agriculture ==
According to the Imperial Gazetteer of India, sugar-cane, indigo and poppy were grown in Umaidpur and the adjacent villages during and before British rule. Between 1800 and early nineteenth century, the cultivation of indigo plants and poppy was more prevalent. Indigo dye made in India was exported by British as a luxury product. Maharaja of Darbhanga abandoned the cultivation of indigo around 1901, because the fall in the price of indigo dye, due to the competition of artificial substitutes, which also caused many other factories to abandon.

The principal exports were rice, indigo, gram, pulses, linseed, mustard seed, saltpetre, tobacco, hides, and ghee; and the principal imports were rice and other food-grains, salt, kerosene oil, gunny-bags, coal and coke, European cotton piece-goods, and raw cotton. Gram, pulses, and oilseeds were chiefly sent to Calcutta, and rice and other food-grains to Saran and Muzaffarpur. The imports of food-grains came for the most part from Bhagalpur and Nepal, coal and coke from Burdwary kerosene oil from the Twenty-four Parganas, and salt and piece-goods from Calcutta.

The most fertile part of the village were used to produce the most valuable rabi and bhadoi crops. In the low-lying areas, the main crop grown is winter rice, though in some parts good rabi crops are also raised on the lands. Rabi and Bhadoi crops were grown from 1800 until recently (1980). Villages like Umaidpur were chiefly dependent on the Aghani (or winter) rabi and bhadoi harvests. The village land falls into two classes: Bhith (uplands) and Dhanhar (low lands where water logging occurred during rainy season). Bhith was further classified as saliferous land or usher (soils in which salinity is mainly due to accumulation of alkali salts are called alkali soils) was found in patches in the outer area between good land and low-lying land. Nunia caste from the neighbouring village, Nauachak, used to extract saltpetere in the summer after rabi crop from these lands for their living. In these lands small farmers grew mainly 'Marua, also called mandua, nachini or Ragi' or Finger Millets (Eleusine coracana), Kauni (foxtail milet) and Sama (kutaki or little milet). In Bhith land, wheat, maize, and miscellaneous food-grains which consisted chiefly of khesari, rahari, masuri, urd, mung, janera, and oats. Food-crops grown also included potatoes, and suthni (Dioscorea fasciculate). The chief non-food crops are oilseeds. Tobacco and chilies are cultivated as commercial crops. Of the other non-food crops, kharhaul or thatching-grass was the most valuable, but now these lands are used for growing paddy.

== Governance ==
Umaidpur became a part of Samastipur district, when Darbhanga district was split into three districts in 1972. Before British, the mention of this district in the Imperial Gazetteer of India (volume 11) goes back to A. D. 1400. When this area was taken over by the British in 1765, it was included in Silbah Bihar and formed with the greater part of Muzaffarpur District, the Sarkar of Tirhut. Bihar was retained as an independent revenue division, and in 1782 Tirhut (including Hajipur) was made into a Collectorate. In 1875 Tirhut was divided into the two existing Districts of Muzaffarpur and Darbhanga. The governance of the Umiadpur village is run through community development block program administered by a Morwa Block Development Officer, Morwa Dakshin Panchayat headed by Mukhiya, and a local administrative unit at the village level. The law enforcement is provided by Tajpur Police Station. The village is under the civial jurisdiction of Samastipur district. Umaidpur village is a part of Morwa (Vidhan Sabha constituency) and the current member of this constituency of Bihar Legislative Assembly is Vidya Sagar Singh Nishad of JD(U). Lok Sabha Constituency of Umaidpur village is No. 22 Ujiarpur (Lok Sabha constituency). The Lok Sabha member is Nityanand Rai, Bharatiya Janta Party.
