= Sinhala =

Sinhala may refer to:

- Sinhala or Sinhala dvipa, another name of Sri Lanka
- Sinhalese people, an ethno-linguistic group native to Sri Lanka
- Sinhala language, the native language of the Sinhalese people
- Sinhala script, the writing system of the Sinhala language
  - Sinhala (Unicode block), a block of Sinhala characters in Unicode
- Sinhala cinema, cinema in the Sinhala language
- Sinhala Kingdom, the successive historical Sinhalese kingdoms of Sri Lanka between 543 BCE and 1815 CE
- "Sinhala", a song from the 1999 album The Magical Sounds of Banco de Gaia

== See also ==
- Sinha, an Indian surname
- Sinh (disambiguation)
- Simha (disambiguation)
- Singam (disambiguation)
- Singham (disambiguation)
- Singa (disambiguation)
- Singhania (disambiguation)
- Singh, an Indian surname
