= Singa =

Singa may refer to:

== Places ==
- Singa (Haida village), a historical village on Haida Gwaii, British Columbia, Canada
- Singa, Estonia, a village in Mõniste Parish, Võru County
- Singa, Nepal
- Singa District, Huamalíes Province, Peru
  - Singa, Peru, a village and capital of the district
- Singa, Sudan, a town
- A village in the Kumbugu district of Ghana
- Singa, Arunachal Pradesh

== Other uses ==
- Singa, a common transliteration of the name of Nzinga of Ndongo and Matamba (c. 1583 – 1663)
- Singa (spider), a genus of spiders
- Singa (mythology), a mythical creature of the Batak people of Sumatra, Indonesia
- Singa the Lion, the mascot for the National Courtesy Campaign in Singapore
- Singa clan, an ethnic group of 15th century Rwanda
- Singa language, a Bantu language of Uganda

== See also ==
- Singam (disambiguation)
- Singham (disambiguation)
- Sinhala (disambiguation)
- Simha (disambiguation)
- Singhania (disambiguation)
- Singh, an Indian surname
- Sinha, an Indian surname
- Singha, a beer brand
- Singga, an Indian singer, actor, director
