= Singhania =

Singhania is an Indian family name. It may refer to:

== People ==
- Singhania family, a prominent Indian business family, including:
  - Gautam Singhania (born 1965), Indian industrialist, chairman of the Raymond Group
  - Gopal Krishna Singhania (1933–1980), Indian industrialist
  - Hari Shankar Singhania (1933–2013), Indian industrialist
  - Lala Kamlapat Singhania (1884–1937), Indian industrialist, founder of JK Organisation
  - Lala Lakshmipat Singhania (1910–1976), Indian entrepreneur and industrialist
  - Padampat Singhania (1904–1979), Indian industrialist and politician
  - Vijaypat Singhania, Indian industrialist, politician, and balloonist
- Shankar Singhania, primary antagonist of the 2001 Bollywood film Indian, portrayed by Danny Denzongpa

== Organizations ==
- Singhania University in Rajasthan, India
- Sir Padampat Singhania University in Rajasthan, India
- Lakshmipat Singhania Academy in Rajasthan and West Bengal, India

== See also ==
- Singhana (disambiguation)
- Singham (disambiguation)
- Singam (disambiguation)
- Simha (disambiguation)
- Sinhala (disambiguation)
- Singa (disambiguation)
- Singh, an Indian surname
- Sinha, an Indian surname
