= Sinh =

Sinh may refer to:

- Hyperbolic sine, abbreviated as sinh, a mathematical function
- Sinh (clothing), a traditional women's garment from Southeast Asia
- Singh, an Indian title and surname
- Sinhala script (ISO 15924 abbreviation: Sinh)

== See also ==
- SIMH, an emulator software
- Simha (disambiguation)
- Sinhala (disambiguation)
