= Jaintpur =

- village
- Country: India
- State: Bihar
- District: Muzaffarpur

Languages
  - Official: Maithili, Hindi
- Time zone: UTC+5:30 (IST)
- Postal code: 843123
- ISO 3166 code: IN-BR

Jaintpur is a village in Muzaffarpur district, Bihar state, India. Also known as Jaintpur Estate, it is situated on the banks of a Himalayan glacier-fed perennial river, the Baya Nadi River, between NH-102 (Saraiya) and NH-28 (Motipur).

Jaintpur Estate popularly is the home of the Bhumihar Zamindar Family of Bihar, Badri Vishal Naryan Prasad Singh, who was awarded with Diwan Bahadur, a title of honour awarded during British rule in India. It is supposedly one of the most powerful political families in Bihar. Mahesh Babu, Usha Sinha along with her late husband Birendra Kumar Singh represented Vaishali and Paroo in Lok Sabha and the state assembly for over a decade. The family is well known not only for its land, politics and wealth but also for its honesty integrity and dedication towards the welfare of Bihar.

Mahesh Babu's youngest daughter Usha Sinha was married to Birendra Kumar Singh (1943–95), the Jaintpur zamindar, who represented Paroo (Muzaffarpur) in the Bihar Assembly more than once. Birendra Singh also started an NGO, Lok Shiksha Sansthan; in 1993. Given his sensitivity for linguistic minority, unlike most other Public schools, the Public School run by the Lok Shiksha Sansthan offers the teaching of Urdu literature from standard V to X. The District Gazette of Muzaffarpur has glowing words to appreciate the Jaintpur estate for patronising, education, art and culture. Mrs Usha Sinha (born in 1944, she was elected MLA from Paroo, Muzaffarpur in 1985, and then to the Lok Sabha from Vaishali in 1989; served as Deputy Minister, Family Welfare in the Union Government led by VP Singh) is particularly more concerned about the political empowerment of the women, testified by her efforts at mobilising the women to join the Congress. exercise is a passion for her, and she remains undaunted by the fact that in recent decades it is an uphill task to persuade people to join the Congress in Bihar, more so when the necessary organisational support is also not forthcoming. It should be recalled that Jaintpur Estate had special relationships with Travancore royal family

Nitish Kumar, the chief minister of Bihar paid a tribute to him on 22 June 2006 when he visited Mahesh Babu's ancestral village, Karnauti (Mahnar, Vaishali) and announced to upgrade the Middle School, named after Kamla, the wife of Mahesh Babu. This school is housed in the ancestral house of Mahesh Babu, which he had donated for the education of his villagers. In Monghyr, Kamla Seva Sadan and the Kamla-Mahesh Library are also functioning. This has a collection of thousands of books which were in the reading and possession of Mahesh Babu. Kamla had given up consuming salt ever since the Salt Satyagraha, and used only Khadi clothes throughout her life. Himself having undergone the tribulations and deprivations of an orphan child, he had also established an orphanage. Muzaffarpur, a fastest growing city, cannot forget the contributions of Mahesh Babu and the Jaintpur Estate, as a token of which they have named the chowk of Juran Chapra in the city, after this leader. Mahesh Babu's eldest daughter, Krishna Shahi, represented Begusarai in Lok Sabha several times and she also served as Union Minister. The descendants of the family are Usha Sinha, followed by her two sons Anunay Kumar Singh and Dr Anuneet Sinha and their children Anantveer Singh, Krishangi Sinha and Treya Sinha.
