= Harpur Pusa =

- Village
- Location within India
- Coordinates: 25°58′N 85°40′E
- Country: India
- State: Bihar
- District: Samastipur
- Block: Pusa
- Elevation: 55 m (180 ft)

Population (2011)
  - Total: 2,799
- Pin Code: 848125
- ISO 3166 code: IN-BR

Harpur Pusa is a village located in Pusa Block of Samastipur district, Bihar in India.

As of 2011, Harpur Pusa contained 417 families. Its total population was 2799, 1431 males and 1368 females, as per Population Census 2011. There were 1888 children up to age 6 is 1888, 16.73% of the total village population . Average Sex Ratio of Harpur Pusa village was 898 which is lower than Bihar state average of 918. Child Sex Ratio for the Harpur Pusa as per census was 942, higher than the Bihar average of 935.

In 2011, Harpur Pusa had a 73.12% literacy rate compared to the Bihar average of 61.80%. Male literacy was 84.86% while female literacy was 59.91%.

Harpur Pusa is administrated by an elected Sarpanch (Head of Village). Harpur Pusa village out of total population, 1838 were engaged in work activities. 63.82% of workers describe their work as Main Work (Employment or Earning more than 6 Months) while 36.18% were involved in Marginal activity providing livelihood for less than 6 months. Of 1838 workers engaged in Main Work, 427 were cultivators (owner or co-owner) while 610 were Agricultural labourer. Mainly people depending on agriculture.
