= Bhullu Sahni =

Indian humanitarian, swimmer and lifesaver

Bhullu Sahni is an Indian humanitarian, swimmer and lifesaver. He predominantly serves as a vocal advocate for the rights and inclusion of the visually impaired people in his village. He was well known for his bravery for saving the lives of 13 individuals from drowning.

== Early life ==
He lost his eyesight at a young age during his childhood. He resides in Dumduma village in Samastipur and he was raised up around water reservoirs. It was his father Kailu Sahni who taught him the basics of swimming and also taught him the aspect of fishing while Bhullu was in his childhood.

== Work ==
He has frequently organised various awareness campaigns to educate people about the impact of blindness. He has been dubbed and hailed as man of the crisis by many in his community highlighting his generous efforts to rescue people from water related accidents despite his blindness. He was also heaped praise for his swimming abilities as he mastered the craft of swimming to help rescue people from drowning in water. He was also affectionately nicknamed as the "Water Warrior" in his community.
