= Kaina =

Kaina can mean:

- Kaina (Manipur), a small hillock in Manipur sacred to Hindu
- Kaina, Samastipur, a village in Samastipur district
- Kaina (singer), American singer
- Käina, a small borough in Hiiu County, Estonia
