= Tajpur, Bihar =

Tajpur ताजपुर
- Town and Community Development Block
- Interactive map of Tajpur
- Coordinates: 25°51′N 85°39′E
- Country: India
- State: Bihar
- Division: Darbhanga
- District: Samastipur

Government
  - Type: Nagar Parishad

Area
  - Total: 55.14 km^{2} (21.29 sq mi)
- Elevation: 51 m (167 ft)

Population (2011)
  - Total: 161,626
  - Density: 2,931/km^{2} (7,590/sq mi)

Sex ratio
  - Females per 1,000 males: 897

Literacy
  - Total: 57.4%
- Time zone: UTC+5:30 (IST)
- PIN: 848130
- Area code: 06274
- Vehicle registration: BR-33
- Vidhan Sabha constituency: Morwa
- Lok Sabha constituency: Ujiarpur
- Website: tajpurnagarparishad.net

Tajpur is a town and community development block (C.D. block) in Samastipur district of the Indian state of Bihar. It serves as the headquarters of the Tajpur block and is administered as a Nagar Parishad. The town is located approximately 12 kilometres west of the district headquarters at Samastipur and forms part of the Darbhanga division, which falls within the historical Mithila cultural region of north Bihar.

== History ==
The name Tajpur carries administrative significance stretching back to the British colonial period. When Darbhanga was part of the larger Sarkar Tirhut territory, the British constituted it as a separate district in 1875. The sub-divisions, however, had been carved out earlier: Darbhanga Sadar in 1845, Madhubani in 1866, and the subdivision that would later become Samastipur—then officially known as Tajpur—in 1867. This subdivision was subsequently renamed Samastipur and, following the reorganisation of Bihar's districts in 1972, was upgraded to a full independent district. The present-day town of Tajpur thus preserves the historical name of this once-significant administrative subdivision. Samastipur district itself, of which Tajpur is a part, came into existence on 14 November 1972 when it was carved out of the erstwhile Darbhanga district.

== Geography ==
Tajpur is situated at an elevation of approximately 51 metres above sea level. The Tajpur block spans a total area of 55.14 km², making it the smallest C.D. block by area in Samastipur district. The nearby rivers include the Burhi Gandak and the Baya Nadi, both of which flow in the vicinity of the block and contribute to its agricultural ecology. The nearest airport is Muzaffarpur Airport, approximately 37.5 kilometres away by aerial distance.

== Demographics ==
According to the 2011 Census of India, the Tajpur block had a total population of 161,626, of whom 85,179 were male and 76,447 were female. The block had 30,523 households, with an average household size of approximately 5.3 persons. The population density stood at 2,931 persons per square kilometre. The sex ratio was 897 females per 1,000 males. Children in the 0–6 age group numbered 28,392, accounting for roughly 18 per cent of the total population, with a child sex ratio of 894 girls per 1,000 boys. The overall literacy rate of the block was 57.4 per cent, with male literacy at 63.75 per cent and female literacy at 50.31 per cent. The block comprised 61 revenue villages as per the 2011 Census, with Shahpur Baghauni being the largest by population and Chak Ahmad the smallest.

== Notable people ==
- Vaibhav Sooryavanshi

== See also ==
- Samastipur district
- Darbhanga division
- Morwa Assembly constituency
- Ujiarpur Lok Sabha constituency
- Burhi Gandak River
- Community development block in India
