= Kedushah =

Kedushah may refer to:

- Holiness in Judaism
- Kedushah (prayer)
