= National Highway 527E (India) =

National highway in India

Route information
- Length: 46.45 km (28.86 mi)

Major junctions
- North end: Darbhanga
- South end: Rosera

Location
- Country: India
- States: Bihar

Highway system
- Roads in India; Expressways; National; State; Asian

National Highway 527E, commonly called NH 527E, is a national highway in the state of Bihar in India. It is a secondary route of National Highway 27.

== See also ==
- List of national highways in India
