= Simhah =

Simhah (Hebrew: שִׂמְחָה śimḥāʰ; Hebrew pronunciation: [simˈχa], Yiddish pronunciation: [ˈsɪmχə]) is a Hebrew word that means gladness, or joy, and is often used as a given name. Related names include Simha, Simcha, and Simchah. Notable people with the name include:

- Meir Simhah ha-Kohen of Dvinsk (1843–1926), Orthodox Jewish rabbi
- Naḥman ben Simḥah Berlin, Jewish polemnist writer
- Nahman Ben Simhah of Bratslav (1772–1810), the founder of the Breslov Hasidic movement
- Simhah Simon ben Abraham Calimani (1699–1784), Venetian rabbi
- Simhah b. Samuel of Speyer (13th century), German rabbi and tosafist
- Simhah ben Samuel of Vitry, (died 1105), French Talmudist of the 11th and 12th centuries
- Simhah Bunem of Przysucha (1765–1827), Grand Rabbi of Peshischa
- Simḥah Isaac Luzki (1716–1766?), Karaite Kabbalist
- Simhah of Rome, Jewish scholar and rabbi who lived in Rome in the last quarter of the thirteenth century AD
- Simhah Pinsker (1801–1864), Polish-Jewish scholar and archeologist born at Tarnopol, Galicia
- Simhah Reuben Edelmann (1821–1892), Russian grammarian and commentator
- Solomon b. Simhah Dob Mandelkern (1846–1902), Ukrainian Jewish poet and author

== See also ==
- Jayasimha (disambiguation)
- Samhah
- Sima Hui
