= Banbira =

Coordinates: 25°43′N 85°37′E

Banbira, or Banvira, is a village in Bihar, India. It is located in Morwa Tehsil of Samastipur District. It is situated 18 km away from sub-district headquarter Morwa and 28 km away from district headquarter Samastipur. As per 2009 stats, Banbeera is the gram panchayat of Banbira village.

The total geographical area of village is 219 hectares. In the 2011 census Banbira had a total population of 6,224 people (3,301 male and 2,923 female) spread between 1,323 households. There are about 1,323 houses in Banbira village. Samastipur is nearest town to Banbira which is approximately 28 km away.

== Nearby villages of Banbira ==
1. Jitwarpur Bhuskhara
2. Indar Wara
3. Pachbhinda
4. Mahmudpur
5. Kumaia
6. Halai
7. Bangora
8. Purkhotimpur Asli
9. Purkhotimpur Dakhli
10. Chaklal Sahi
