= Holiness in Judaism =

Key concept in Jewish thought

Holiness in Judaism, often referred to by the Hebrew word for holiness, kedushah (Hebrew: קְדֻשָּׁה), is a central concept in Jewish thought, representing the idea of separation, elevation, and dedication to God. In Jewish tradition, holiness is a property of God, the Jewish people, specific places, times, actions, and items.

== Etymology, definition, and translation ==
The Hebrew word קֹדֶשׁ, transliterated as qodesh, is used in the Torah to mean "set-apartness" and "separateness," as well as "holiness" and "sacredness." The Torah describes the Aaronite priests and the Levites as being selected by God to perform the Temple services; they, as well, are called "holy."

In Priestly literature, holiness is understood as a dynamic and potent manifestation of the Divine Presence that radiates outward, infusing persons, objects, places, and times with sacred power and transforming them into what belongs uniquely to God. Jewish philosophy professor Alan Mittleman describes it an active force that can be absorbed and transmitted. At the same time, holiness also makes certain aspirational requirements on human behavior through rituals and ethical behavior.

== Biblical Origins ==
In the Hebrew Bible, God is described as holy and completely distinct from the physical world. Early biblical traditions present holiness as potent and potentially destructive. In stories such as the revelation at Mount Sinai (Exodus 19), holiness is a property of space and matter such as places, objects, and persons. This conception is shared with broader ancient worldviews. The holiness of time is also a biblical concept. Shabbat is described as a day of holiness set apart from the rest of the week. Sacred places, such as the Mishkan (Tabernacle) and later the Beit HaMikdash (Temple), are described as imbued with the Divine Presence.

Later biblical developments, especially the Holiness Code, refine this earlier Priestly framework by explicitly linking holiness to ethical conduct. These texts expand holiness beyond ritual precision to include interpersonal obligations, teaching that moral behavior toward others is itself a form of service to God. Many scholars see this trajectory as central to the Torah’s contribution to religious thought.

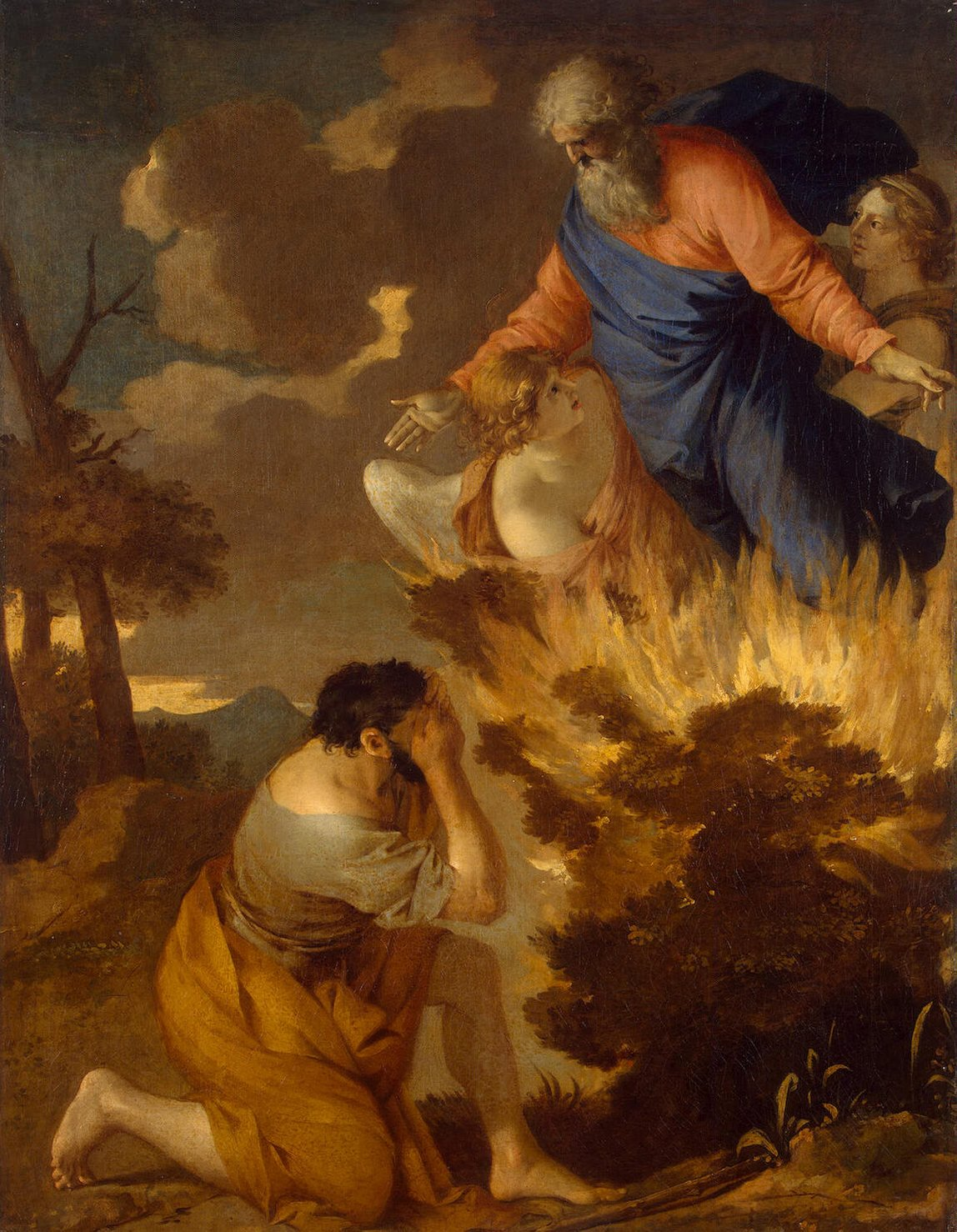
Burning Bush. Seventeenth-century painting by Sébastien Bourdon in the Hermitage Museum, Saint Petersburg

Encounters with the divine presence, such as those experienced by Moses at the burning bush or Isaiah in his temple vision, are depicted as transformative and morally demanding. These encounters provoke fear and humility, as the individuals recognize that contact with holiness requires a reorientation of life toward higher ethical and spiritual standards. Holiness, once encountered, imposes obligations rather than conferring mere privilege.

== Separation and elevation ==
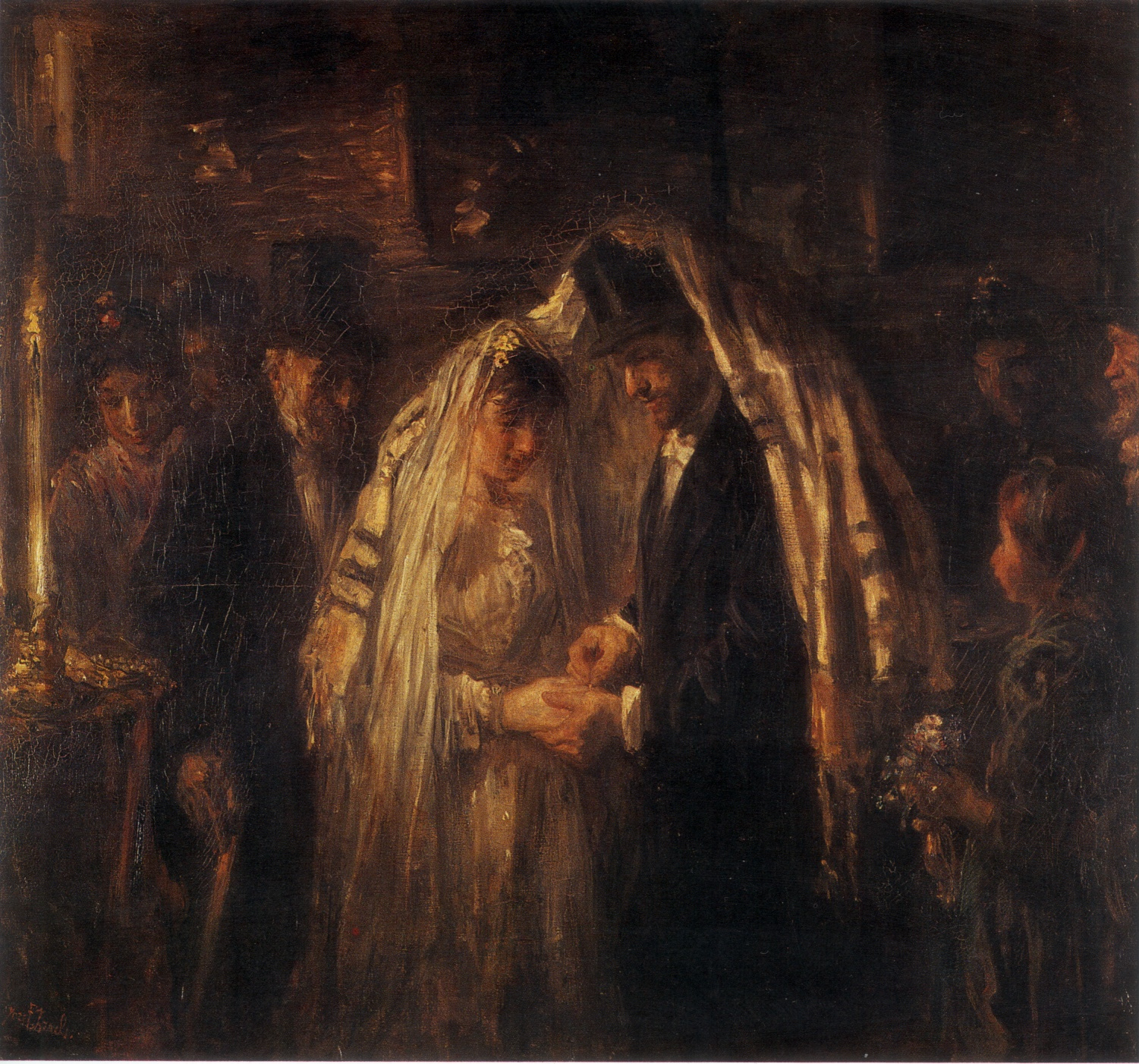
A Jewish wedding (1903) by Jozef Israëls. The couple are depicted in the process of the kiddushin ritual.

Holiness in Judaism is widely understood as a status acquired through relationship rather than an intrinsic quality: persons, times, and objects do not begin as holy but become so through designation, consecration, or use. Holiness represents the idea of separation—being set apart from what is ordinary or profane. However, it also signifies elevation, as something is made holy when it is dedicated to a higher purpose. This is evident in the sanctification of objects used for mitzvot (commandments), such as tefillin or a Torah scroll, which become holy by virtue of their use in divine service. At the same time, biblical and rabbinic sources show that the root k-d-sh can also denote being set apart for a special purpose without explicit divine ownership, as in Jeremiah 22:7, or in rabbinic Hebrew where mikadesh describes marriage, by which a woman is designated as exclusively set aside for her husband.

Contemporary Jewish philosopher Samuel Lebens understands holiness as an attitude of awe that arises from perceiving the world as saturated with divine presence, an orientation that also supports moral responsibility. Drawing on Rashi and Midrashic traditions, Lebens argues that holiness depends less on ascetic restraint than on resisting the objectification of others. Moral goodness is a necessary condition of holiness, even though moral goodness alone does not suffice to make a person holy.

In personal life, this concept manifests through ethical and ritual observance. For example, Jewish law requires individuals to sanctify themselves in what is permissible, meaning that even ordinary activities like eating or engaging in business should be infused with a sense of purpose and alignment with God's will.

== Instances of holiness ==
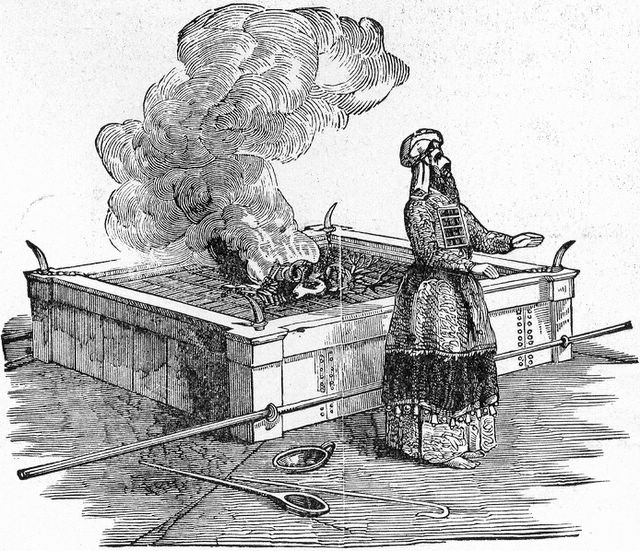
The High Priest offers the sacrifice of a goat performing korban

Holiness can be attributed to God, divine attributes such as God's name or spirit, sacred places, objects consecrated for ritual use, priests, the people of Israel, the covenant, and sanctified times such as Shabbat. Mittleman describes a graded vocabulary of holiness, ranging from kodesh kodashim (most holy) and kodesh to states of ritual purity (tahor) and impurity (tame).

Any personal possession may be dedicated to the Temple of God, after which its misappropriation is considered among the gravest of sins. The various sacrifices are holy. Those that may be eaten have very specific rules concerning who may eat which of their parts, and time limits on when the consumption must be completed. Most sacrifices contain a part to be consumed by the priests – a portion of the holy to be consumed by God's holy devotees.

According to Rabbi Abraham Joshua Heschel:

"When history began, there was only one holiness the world, holiness in time. When at Sinai the word of God was about to be heard, a call for holiness in man was proclaimed .... It was only after the people had succumbed to the temptation of worshipping a thing ... that the erection of a Tabernacle, of holiness in space, was commanded. The sanctity of time came first, the sanctity of man came second, and the sanctity of space last. Time was hallowed by God; space ... was consecrated by Moses ...."

=== The People of Israel ===
In the Hebrew Bible, the holiness of the People of Israel is grounded in covenant rather than inherent status, most explicitly expressed in Exodus 19:6, which describes Israel as “a kingdom of priests and a holy nation” (am kadosh). Classical Jewish interpretation understands this holiness as arising from Israel’s relationship with God and the obligations that flow from it, particularly the observance of commandments (mitzvot) that regulate ritual practice, ethical conduct, and communal life. Scholars note that this conception of holiness entails forms of separation and discipline. Holiness is not a fixed attribute of the People of Israel; it requires continual maintenance. Some later mystical and theological traditions advanced more essentialist or biological claims about Jewish holiness, but these views are contested within Jewish thought. Biblical and rabbinic sources tend to emphasize covenantal and ethical interpretations of the holiness of the People of Israel.

=== Places ===
Certain places are considered holier than others. The Land of Israel is often referred to as the Holy Land, and within it, Jerusalem and the Temple Mount are considered the holiest locations. The Mishkan (Tabernacle) and later the Beit HaMikdash (Temple) were physical spaces designated for divine service, and the holiness of these places was so profound that access was restricted to certain times and individuals, such as the Kohanim (priests) and the Kohen Gadol (High Priest). God commands Moses at the burning bush to remove his sandals because the ground itself was holy (Exodus 3:5). Classical interpretations understand this command as reflecting the idea that holiness can adhere to physical space and objects. This conception of spatial holiness is also reflected in ancient Temple practice, particularly during the First Temple period.

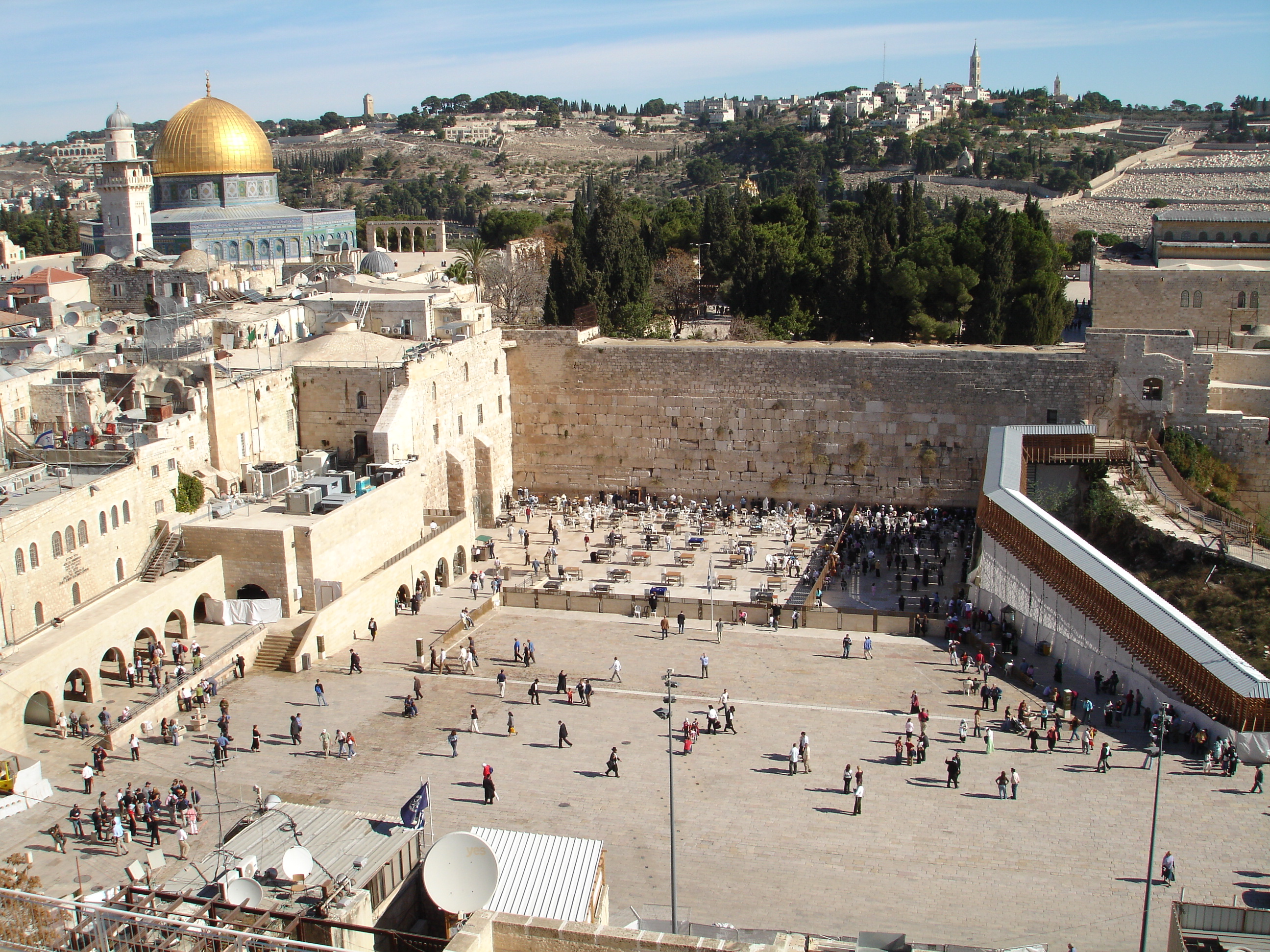
The Western Wall, one of the last relics of the Temple in Jerusalem

Some biblical and rabbinic models of holiness portray holiness as quasi-contagious, emanating from a central sacred locus and diminishing with distance. The Mishnah lists concentric circles of holiness surrounding the Temple in Jerusalem: Holy of Holies, Temple Sanctuary, Temple Vestibule, Court of Priests, Court of Israelites, Court of Women, Temple Mount, the walled city of Jerusalem, all the walled cities of Israel, and the borders of the Land of Israel. Distinctions are made as to who and what are permitted in each area.

Classical Jewish sources debate how the Land of Israel acquires and retains holiness. Several rabbis in the Talmud hold that the land was sanctified when the Israelites settled in the land following the events detailed in the Five Books of Moses. Rabbinic literature reflects disagreement over the permanence of this sanctification: some sages maintained that Jerusalem’s holiness lapsed after the destruction and exile, while others argued that it was sanctified permanently. Maimonides adopts a differentiated position, ruling that the initial sanctification of the land through conquest was not enduring, but that a later consecration in the time of Ezra, achieved through settled possession (ḥazakah) rather than conquest, established lasting holiness; by contrast, he maintains that the Temple itself was sanctified once and for all.

Within Jewish law, sacred space is not limited to the land itself but also includes communal places of worship:

"Because it is a place designated for public prayer gatherings, [a synagogue] is considered like a mini-Temple. Consequently, comparable to the Temple, one must treat a synagogue with reverence while it is functional and even after it has been destroyed. Nonetheless, there are ways to remove the sanctity of a synagogue, either by transferring that sanctity to another item of equal or greater status, or by selling the synagogue with the agreement of the community and its representatives."

=== Time ===
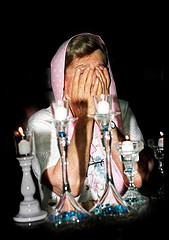
Jewish woman reciting blessing over Shabbat candles

Holiness is also ascribed to time in Jewish thought. The biblical command to “remember the Sabbath day to sanctify it” (Exodus 20:8) establishes holiness in recurring sacred time, a theme later emphasized by thinkers such as Abraham Joshua Heschel, who argued that the holiness of Shabbat precedes that of Israel and remains intact even when it is not observed. Rabbinic tradition stresses that entering the sanctity of Shabbat requires deliberate preparation, both practical and psychological, involving a transition away from the routines of labor and commerce. Classical sources describe preparing food, clothing, and one’s mindset as integral to honoring the day, with even wealthy individuals expected to participate personally in preparations. Shabbat is further distinguished from the rest of the week through changes in dress, speech, movement, and communal enjoyment, including festive meals and wine, all of which serve to mark sacred time as qualitatively different from ordinary time and to cultivate an awareness of its holiness.

Similarly, the Jewish holidays (moedim) are considered holy times, each imbued with its own particular form of sanctity. These sacred times are opportunities for individuals and the community to connect more deeply with God and reflect on the spiritual dimensions of life.

== Interpretations ==
Different Jewish thinkers have approached the concept of holiness in various ways. For some, holiness is primarily about creating boundaries that separate the sacred from the profane. For others, it is more about a continuous process of spiritual growth, where one elevates oneself and the world through good deeds and mitzvot.

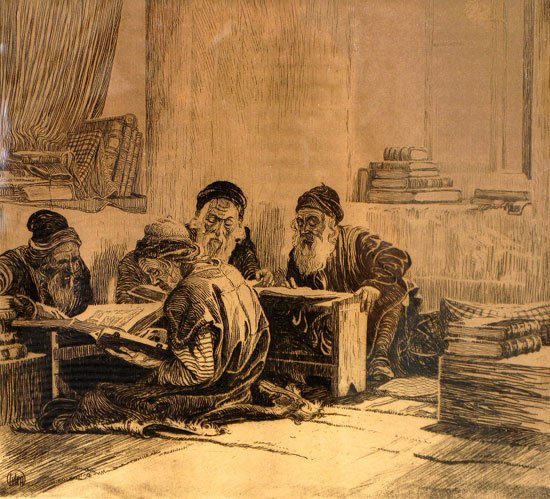
Talmud students

Rabbinic Judaism emphasizes that holiness need not be sought through withdrawal from ordinary life or through rare ecstatic experiences. The commandments and rhythms of Torah study provide structured means for cultivating holiness amid daily responsibilities. Later mystical traditions, such as those associated with the Baal Shem Tov, emphasize intentionality, teaching that directing one’s thoughts and actions toward God can elevate everyday life.

Medieval Jewish philosopher Maimonides offered a highly intellectualized account of holiness, identifying holiness with correct knowledge of God rather than with any intrinsic quality of objects, peoples, or places. In the Guide for the Perplexed, he presents Abraham as someone who recognized that celestial bodies are not divine but part of the created order, thereby affirming God’s absolute transcendence (Guide III:29). Maimonides further argues that ritual institutions such as sacrifice and the Temple were historically necessary stages in Israel’s religious development, functioning as transitional practices suited to the spiritual capacities of their time rather than as permanent expressions of ideal worship (Guide III:32). Similarly, Rabbi Samson Raphael Hirsch argued that holiness is not inherent in objects or people but is achieved through the performance of mitzvot. He taught that holiness is a potential that must be actualized through actions.

Mittleman describe holiness as a kind of “social fact”: it depends on human consciousness and communal recognition, yet it is objective and causally effective within a society. Just as money is more than paper because of the roles and meanings assigned to it, holiness is real because of the normative structures that sustain it. Holy places, times, persons, and objects are distinguished as such by how they are treated under the Torah. Holiness is thus relational and functional: things become holy when they orient human life toward God.

== See also ==
- Happiness in Judaism
- Anger in Judaism
- Heaven in Judaism
- Bereavement in Judaism
- Kiddush Hashem
- Shabbat
