= Singhana =

Singhana may refer to:

- Singhana, Madhya Pradesh, India
- Singhana, Rajasthan, India
- Simhana or Singhana, 13th-century ruler from present-day India

== See also ==
- Singhania (disambiguation)
- Simha (disambiguation)
