= Kishanpur Yusuf =

Village in Bihar, India

Kishanpur Yusuf is a village in Samastipur taluk, in Samastipur District in the state of Bihar, India.

Place / Post Office	Kishanpur Yusuf
Pincode	848505
District	Samastipur
Latitude:	25.72583
Longitude:	85.62196
State:	Bihar

Kishanpur Yusuf is surrounded by Raipur in east, Rasalpur in west, Khalishpur in North and Mohiuddin Nagar in south. The main occupation is farming.

This village has a rich cultural heritage. Alia pir baba is one of them. Here devotees come every year to pray in a large number. Kishanpur Yusuf is also known for its Middle school which is basically a good source of education for poor people or the person who does not afford to pay for the education of children.

The village consists of mainly two religions, i.e. Hindu and Muslim.
