= Naya Nagar =

Naya Nagar Nayanagar
- Nicknames: Baba Viranchi Singh, Bhardwaj Prakahetra
- Location in Bihar, India Naya Nagar (India)
- Coordinates: 25.7465°N 86.1027°E
- Country: India
- State: Bihar
- District: Samastipur District
- Subdivision: Rosera
- Vidhan Sabha constituency: Hasanpur
- Lok Sabha constituency: Khagaria

Population
  - Total: 10,247

Languages
  - Official: Maithili, Hindi
- Time zone: UTC+5:30 (IST)
- Postal code: 848208
- Website: samastipur.bih.nic.in

Nayanagar is a village located at 25.7465°N 86.1027°E in the Rosera Subdivision of Samastipur district. Total Population of Nayanagar is 10247 as of 2011 Census.
