= Darbhanga division =

Administrative division in Bihar, India

- Division of Bihar
- Location of Darbhanga division in Bihar
- Coordinates: 26.17°N 85.9°E
- Country: India
- State: Bihar
- Region: Mithila
- Headquarters: Darbhanga
- Districts: Darbhanga, Madhubani, Samastipur

Government
  - Commissioner: H. R. Shrinivas

Population (2011)
  - Total: 12,652,797
- Website: darbhangadivision.bih.nic.in

Darbhanga Division is an administrative geographical unit of Bihar state of India, and Darbhanga city is the administrative headquarters of the division. It is a part of historical Mithila region. The main language of the division is Maithili. As of 2023, the division consists of Darbhanga district, Madhubani district, and Samastipur district.

== Subdivisions ==
=== Darbhanga district ===
- Darbhanga Sadar
- Benipur
- Biraul

=== Madhubani district ===
- Madhubani Sadar
- Benipatti
- Jhanjarpur
- Phulparas
- Jainagar

=== Samastipur district ===
- Samastipur Sadar
- Dalsinghsarai
- Rosera
- Patori

== Languages ==
Languages of Darbhanga division in 2011
1. Maithili (65.0%)
2. Hindi (20.0%)
3. Urdu (14.0%)
4. Other (0.96%)

== See also ==
- Divisions of Bihar
- Districts of Bihar
