= Kaina, Samastipur =

Coordinates: 31°04′N 77°24′E

Kaina Kaina-Mahe Gram Panchayat
- village
- Interactive map of Kaina
- Country: India
- State: Bihar
- District: Samastipur
- Named for: Sri Ram Govind Singh Jha

Population
  - Total: 4,000

Languages
  - Official: Maithili, Hindi, English
- Time zone: UTC+5:30 (IST)
- Postal code: 848209
- ISO 3166 code: IN-BR
- Vehicle registration: BR-
- Coastline: 0 kilometres (0 mi)
- Nearest city: DARBHANGA
- Lok Sabha constituency: SAMASTIPUR
- Vidhan Sabha constituency: ROSERA

Kaina, Rampur Bahore is a village in Singhia block in Rosera Subdivision in Samastipur District in the state of Bihar, India. Kaina has 5 localities named Panchkhuttee, Tinkhuttee, Pachwair toal, Tola and Puwari Tol. Its population is around 2331.

Kaina is mostly a village of Brahmins(maithil), 80% of the population have the surname Jha. 4 ponds and 4 temples are situated in the village. Literacy level is almost 80 to 85% in the village.
