= Singhana, Madhya Pradesh =

Singhana
- village
- Location in Madhya Pradesh, India
- Coordinates: 22.19°N 74.97°E
- Country: India
- State: Madhya Pradesh
- District: Dhar
- Elevation: 180 m (590 ft)

Population (2014)
  - Total: 18,000

Languages
  - Official: Hindi NiMari
- Time zone: UTC+5:30 (IST)
- PIN: 454345
- Telephone code: 07294

Singhana is a city in Dhar district in the Indian state of Madhya Pradesh. The Maa Harshiddhi Mandir is located here.

== Geography ==
Singhana is located at an average elevation of 180 metres (590 feet).

== Demographics ==
As of 2001 India census, Singhana had a population of 13,460. Males constitute 52% of the population and females 48%. Singhana has an average literacy rate of 80%, lower than the national average of 59.5%: male literacy is 66%, and female literacy is 52%. In Singhana, 15% of the population is under 6 years of age.
