= Anger in Judaism =

Anger in Judaism is treated as a negative trait to be avoided whenever possible. The subject of anger is treated in a range of Jewish sources, from the Hebrew Bible and Talmud to the rabbinical law, Kabbalah, Hasidism, and contemporary Jewish sources.

== Torah ==
In the Book of Genesis, the patriarch Jacob condemned the anger that had arisen in his sons Simeon and Levi: "Cursed be their anger, for it was fierce; and their wrath, for it was cruel."

Some Bible commentators point to God's punishment of Moses, not allowing him to enter the Land of Israel, as being due to Moses's anger at the Jewish people. This anger caused Moses to forget the word of God, curse the Israelites, and ultimately bring death on himself.

== Talmudic literature ==
Restraining oneself from anger is seen as noble and desirable, as Ethics of the Fathers states:

"Ben Zoma said: Who is strong? He who subdues his evil inclination, as it is stated, 'He who is slow to anger is better than a strong man, and he who masters his passions is better than one who conquers a city' (Proverbs 16:32)."

Elsewhere, "Rabbi Eliezer says... Do not be easy to anger."

The Talmud also emphasizes the negative effect anger has on a person.

Anger will cause a sage to lose his wisdom, a person who is destined for greatness to forfeit it.

— The Talmud.

The Talmud links anger to conceit, stating “One who is angry does not even consider the presence of Hashem important."

== Halakha ==
One who becomes angry is as though that person had worshipped idols.

— Moses Maimonides, Mishneh Torah

In its section dealing with ethical traits a person should adopt, Rabbi Shlomo Ganzfried in his Kitzur Shulchan Aruch states: "Anger is also a very evil trait and it should be avoided at all costs. You should train yourself not to become angry even if you have a good reason to be angry."

== Kabbalah ==
Rabbi Chaim Vital taught in the name of his master, Rabbi Yitzchak Luria, the Arizal, that anger may be dispelled by immersing in a ritual bath (mikvah) twice a week, on Tuesdays and Fridays. While immersing, one should meditate on the idea that the numerical value (gematria) of the Hebrew word "mikvah" (Hebrew: מקוה) (ritual bath) is the same as the Hebrew word for anger ("ka'as, Hebrew: כעס).

=== Hasidic Judaism ===
The Rabbi Yisroel Baal Shem Tov, founder of Hasidism, taught that anger may be dispelled by the emphasis on love for God and joy in performing the commandments.

Rabbi Shneur Zalman of Liadi interprets the parallel between anger and idol worship stems from the feelings of the one who has become angry typically coincides with a disregard of Divine Providence – whatever had caused the anger was ultimately ordained from God – through coming to anger one thereby denies the hand of God in one's life.

As with anything else, the way to correct [the traits of anger and pride] is step by step. The first step is to wait. Don’t express your anger or pride verbally. In this way, those emotions will not gain momentum, as can be seen in practice.

— The Lubavitcher Rebbe, Rabbi Menachem Mendel Schneerson.

== Contemporary Judaism ==
Rabbi Harold Kushner finds no grounds for anger toward God because “our misfortunes are none of His doing.” In contrast to Kushner’s reading of the Bible, David Blumenthal finds an “abusing God” whose “sometimes evil” actions evoke vigorous protest, but without severing the protester’s relationship with God.

In a teaching attributed to Rabbi Abraham Isaac Kook, when anger is a mode of life or when expressed in an unjustified manner, is prohibited by Judaism. But if a person is wronged, he or she is allowed to express their natural feelings, including anger.

== See also ==
- Anger
- Happiness in Judaism
- Holocaust theology
- Jewish philosophy
- Yetzer hara
