= Tapan Sinha (admiral) =

Indian naval officer

Surgeon Vice Admiral Tapan Sinha SM
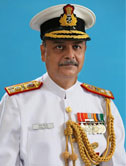
- Sinha as the Director General Medical Services (Navy)
- Military career
- Allegiance: India
- Branch: Indian Navy; Indian Army
- Service years: 27 February 1977 – 2015
- Rank: Surgeon Vice Admiral
- Commands: Director General Medical Services (Navy); Additional DIRECTOR GENERAL ARMED FORCE MEDICAL SERVICES(MR)
- Awards: Sena Medal

Surgeon Vice Admiral Tapan Sinha, SM is the Director General Medical Services of the Indian Navy and a former Additional Director General Armed Forces Medical Services (MR).

== Education ==
Sinha is an alumnus of the Armed Forces Medical College, Pune and pursued an MS (General Surgery) from the University of Pune followed by a Master of Chirurgiae (Urology) from the Institute of Medical Sciences, Banaras Hindu University.

== Career ==
Sinha was commissioned into Army Medical Corps on 27 February 1977. During his career of 37 years he has served as a General Surgeon at various hospitals, Senior Adviser (Surgery & Urology) at the Army Hospital (R & R) at the Delhi Cantonment, and as a Consultant at the Army Hospital (R&R) Delhi Cantonment. He has also served as Brigadier (Medical) at the Headquarters of 33 Corps and Deputy Commandant of Command Hospital (WC) at the Chandimandir Cantonment. Later he was appointed as the Additional Director General Armed Forces Medical Services (MR) in the office of Directorate General Armed Forces Medical Services & Additional Directorate General Medical Service (Army) and also worked in the office of Directorate General Medical Service (Army).

He was awarded a GOC-in-C Commendations Card in 1987. He was awarded a COAS Commendation Card in 2001 and 2002 and received the Sena Medal for distinguished service in 2005. Currently he is working as the Professor of Urology at Hamdard institute of medical sciences and research, Jamia Hamdard.

== Awards ==

Sena Medal
