= Simcha Soroker =

Simcha Soroker (Hebrew: שמחה סורוקר; 1928–2004) was an Israeli economist.

== Biography ==
Soroker was born in Jerusalem and raised in Rehovot and Tel Aviv. He fought in the 1947–1949 Palestine war and later studied economics at the hebrew University of Jerusalem, while also serving as treasurer of the student union and commencing work at the Ministry of Finance.

From the age of 29, in the years 1958-1964 Soroker headed the budget directorate. From 1964 to 1968 he was the economic secretary at the Israeli embassy in London.

Soroker was general director of the Ministry of Communications from 1968 to 1976 under ministers Yisrael Yeshayahu, Elimelekh Rimalt, Shimon Peres and Aharon Uzan. Upon leaving the civil service he was appointed as general director of Union Bank of Israel.

Soroker died in 2004.
