= A. P. B. Sinha =

Indian chemist (1928–2021)

Sandeep Sinha
- Born: 23 September 1928; India
- Died: 4 July 2021 (aged 92); United States
- Education: University of London
- Known for: Studies on manganite synthesis and semiconductor theories
- Awards: 1972 Shanti Swarup Bhatnagar Prize; 1978 NRDC Meritorious Invention Award
- Scientific career
- Fields: Solid state chemistry
- Workplaces: National Chemical Laboratory; Morris Innovative Research

Akhoury Purnendu Bhusan Sinha (23 September 1928 – 4 July 2021) was an Indian solid state chemist who was the head of the Physical Chemistry Division of the National Chemical Laboratory, Pune. He is known for his theories on semiconductors and his studies on synthesis of manganites. He was an elected fellow of the Indian National Science Academy and the Indian Academy of Sciences. The Council of Scientific and Industrial Research, the apex agency of the Government of India for scientific research, awarded Sinha the Shanti Swarup Bhatnagar Prize for Science and Technology, one of the highest Indian science awards, in 1972, for his contributions to chemical sciences.

== Biography ==
A. P. B. Sinha, born on 27 December 1928, joined the University of London from where he secured a PhD in 1954; his thesis was based on solid state chemistry. Later, he served the National Chemical Laboratory, Pune as a director's grade scientist and headed the Physical Chemistry division of the institution. Continuing his researches on solid state chemistry, Sinha studied low mobility semiconductors with respect to its electron transport and crystal distortions caused by electron lattice transitions, switching, magnetic ordering and memory effects. He is known to have synthesized new manganites and reportedly developed a number of solid state products such as thermistors, photocells, magnets and photovoltaic products. Based on his studies on electron lattice interaction, Sinha proposed support theories for the ferroelectricity theory and developed new theories on the thermoelectrical power and mobility in semiconductors. His researches are reported to have widened the understanding of conduction in semiconductors. The body of his literary work is composed of one book, Spectroscopy in inorganic chemistry, chapters to the book, A study of the growth and structure of layers of oxides, sulphides and related compounds, with special reference to the effect of temperature, edited by C. N. R. Rao, and several articles published in peer reviewed journals. (Note: Please see Selected bibliography section) His work has been cited by several authors. (Note: Please see Citations section)

Sinha was associated with journals such as Bulletin Materials Science and Indian Journal of Pure Applied Physics as a member of their editorial boards. The Council of Scientific and Industrial Research awarded him the Shanti Swarup Bhatnagar Prize, one of the highest Indian science awards, in 1972. Sinha was elected by the Indian Academy of Sciences as their fellow in 1974 before he became an elected fellow of the Indian National Science Academy in 1978. He is also an elected fellow of the Maharashtra Academy of Sciences and a recipient of the Meritorious Invention Award of the National Research Development Corporation which he received in 1978. After his stint at NCL, Sinha migrated to the US and is associated with the Morris Innovative Research.

Sinha died in the United States on 4 July 2021, at the age of 92.

== Citations ==
- P Day (January 1972). Electronic Structure and Magnetism of Inorganic Compounds. Royal Society of Chemistry. pp. 108–. ISBN 978-0-85186-251-4.
- J. C. Toledano (January 1988). Defects. CRC Press. pp. 8–. ISBN 978-0-677-25660-3.
- T.A. Kaplan; S.D. Mahanti (11 April 2006). Physics of Manganites. Springer Science & Business Media. pp. 239–. ISBN 978-0-306-47091-2.
- Gerhard Neumann; Cornelis Tuijn (19 August 2011). Self-diffusion and Impurity Diffusion in Pure Metals: Handbook of Experimental Data. Elsevier. pp. 96–. ISBN 978-0-08-056004-5.
- G.J. Long; F. Grandjean (11 November 2013). Mössbauer Spectroscopy Applied to Inorganic Chemistry. Springer Science & Business Media. pp. 176–. ISBN 978-1-4899-2289-2.
- Boris Ildusovich Kharisov; Oxana Vasilievna Kharissova; Ubaldo Ortiz-Mendez (6 January 2016). CRC Concise Encyclopedia of Nanotechnology. CRC Press. pp. 1007–. ISBN 978-1-4665-8089-3.

== Selected bibliography ==
=== Books ===
- Akhoury Purnendu Bhusan Sinha (1954). A study of the growth and structure of layers of oxides, sulphides and related compounds, with special reference to the effect of temperature. Department of Applied Physical Chemistry, Imperial College London.
- Carl Johan Ballhausen; D R Eaton; J W Hastie; R H Hauge; J L Margrave; A S N Murthy; William L Baun; David W Fischer; A Chakravorty; Harry D Schultz; H B Mathur; Chintamani Nagesa Ramachandra Rao; Jack M Williams; S W Peterson; John R Ferraro; Johannes Arnoldus Koningstein; K D J Root; Max T Rogers; H A Kuska; Brian G Ramsey; A P B Sinha (1970). Spectroscopy in inorganic chemistry. Academic Press. OCLC 636106622.

=== Articles ===
- A. P. B. Sinha; N. R. Sanjana; A. B. Biswas (1957). "On the structure of some anganites". Acta Crystallogr. 10 (6): 439–440. Bibcode:1957AcCry..10..439S. doi:10.1107/S0365110X57001450.
- G. I. Finch; A. P. B. Sinha; K. P. Sinha (1957). "Crystal Distortion in Ferrite-Manganites". Proceedings of the Royal Society of London. Series A, Mathematical and Physical Sciences. 242 (1228): 28–35. Bibcode:1957RSPSA.242...28F. doi:10.1098/rspa.1957.0151. S2CID 98289074.
- A.P.B. Sinha; G.V. Chandrashekhar; J.M. Honig (1975). "On the mechanism of electron transport in Cr-doped V2O3". Journal of Solid State Chemistry. 12 (3–4): a. Bibcode:1975JSSCh..12..402S. doi:10.1016/0022-4596(75)90348-5.
- Chandrachood M. R.; Sinha A. P. B.; Morris D. E.; Surnow J. S. (1992). "Lithium substituted superconducting Y1Ba2Cu4O8 formed in elevated oxygen pressure". Physica C: Superconductivity. 192 (1–2): 103–107. Bibcode:1992PhyC..192..103C. doi:10.1016/0921-4534(92)90749-3.
- Liu H. B.; Chen X. D.; Jiang X. P.; Morris D. E.; Sinha A. P. B. (1994). "Effect of lead addition to Bi-based 2222 superconducting cuprates Bi2-xPbxSr2(Y, Ce)2Cu2O10+δ". Physica C: Superconductivity. 220 (3–4): 265–270. Bibcode:1994PhyC..220..265L. doi:10.1016/0921-4534(94)90912-1.
- Zhao Guo-meng; Singh K. K.; Sinha, A. P. B.; Morris D. E. (1995). "Oxygen isotope effect on the effective mass of carriers from magnetic measurements on La2-xSrxCuO4". Physical Review B. 52 (9): 6840–6844. Bibcode:1995PhRvB..52.6840Z. doi:10.1103/PhysRevB.52.6840. PMID 9981913.
- Zhao Guo-meng; Kirtikar Vidula; Singh K. K.; Sinha A. P. B.; Morris Donald E. (1996). "Large copper isotope effect in oxygen depleted YBa2Cu3Oy: importance of Cu-dominated phonon modes in the pairing mechanism". Physical Review B. 54 (21): 14956–14959. Bibcode:1996PhRvB..5414956Z. doi:10.1103/PhysRevB.54.14956. PMID 9985545.

== See also ==
- Manganite
- Ferroelectricity
