= Jandha =

Coordinates: 21°44′N 84°34′E

Jandha is a village in Nilgiris district, Tamil Nadu, India. It is surrounded by mountains and greenery.
