= Happiness in Judaism =

Religious requirement that Jews be happy

Happiness in Judaism and Jewish thought is considered an important value, especially in the context of the service of God. A number of Jewish teachings stress the importance of joy, and demonstrate methods of attaining happiness.

== Terminology ==
There are a number of words in the Hebrew language that denote happiness:

- Simcha (Hebrew: שמחה), happiness more generally, or a celebration (e.g. a wedding, bar/bat mitzvah), it is also a name for both males and females
- Osher (Hebrew: אושר), a deeper, lasting happiness
- Orah (Hebrew: אורה), either "light" or "happiness"
- Gila (Hebrew: גילה), an exuberant outburst of joy or the happiness of discovery
- Rina (Hebrew: רינה), refreshing happiness
- Ditza (Hebrew: דיצה), a sublime joy
- Sasson (Hebrew: ששון), a sudden unexpected happiness
- Tzahala (Hebrew: צהלה), either "happiness" or "dancing"
- Chedva (Hebrew: חדווה), the happiness of togetherness

== Tanach ==
The bible links happiness and joy in the context of the service of God.

All these curses will befall you, pursuing you and overtaking you to destroy you because you did not obey the Lord.... Because you did not serve God, your God, with joy and gladness of the heart.

— Deuteronomy, 28:45, 28:47.

Worship The Lord with gladness; come before him with joyful song.

— Psalms, 100:2.

Ecclesiastes points to the futility of seeking joy and pleasure in life, however, the Talmud comments that this is only true of joy which has not been derived from the fulfilment of a commandment.

I said to myself, "Come now, I will mix with joy and experience pleasure", and behold, it too was vanity. Of laughter, I said, "It is mirth" and concerning joy, "What does it accomplish?"

— Ecclesiastes, 2:1-2.

Elsewhere, the bible links happiness to finding the right answer to a question.

To make an apt answer is a joy to a man, and a word in season, how good it is!

— Proverbs, 15:23.

== Halacha ==
In the Talmud, one of the primary sources for traditional Jewish Law (Halacha), happiness and sadness are associated with particular months of the Jewish calendar. One is meant to increase in happiness during the month of Adar and decrease in happiness during the month of Av. However, in both Maimonides's main legal work and the Code of Jewish Law by Rabbi Yosef Karo, the decrease in joy during Av is mentioned while the increase during Adar is omitted. Some commentaries ascribe this omission to the fact that happiness has no concrete guidelines and depends on the nature of each individual. Whereas acts of sadness and mourning where required by law requires specification and delineation. And though happiness during Adar isn't mentioned in the main Codes, it is mentioned by the Magen Avraham, one of the main commentaries published alongside Karo's work written by Rabbi Avraham Gombiner, and in Kitzur Shulchan Aruch (the "Abbreviated Code of Jewish Law") by Rabbi Shlomo Ganzfried.

There is a Jewish custom to hang a sign in one's home on which is written "When Adar comes in, increase in happiness" (Mishenichnas Adar marbin b'simcha, Hebrew: משנכנס אדר מרבין בשמחה). Some have the custom to place this sign to cover the customary portion of a wall left unfinished serving the memory of the destruction of the Temple in Jerusalem (this wall area is commonly referred to as the zecher l'churban).

According to Maimonides, happiness is an essential element in the performance of Jewish rituals. Maimonides rules in his Code, Yad Hachazakah, that the performance of all commandments must be accompanied by an abundance of joy.

The joy that a person takes in performing a mitzvah and in loving God Who commanded it is itself a great [divine] service.

— Maimonides, Mishneh Torah, Laws of the Lulav 8:15.

In Jewish Law, rejoicing during the Jewish holidays is considered a biblical commandment. Maimonides ruled that this obligation is fulfilled by drinking wine and eating meat.

The Talmud states "One should not stand up to pray while immersed in sorrow, or idleness, or laughter, or chatter, or frivolity, or idle talk, but only while rejoicing in the performance of a commandment (b'simcha shel mitzvah)."

Some rabbinic commentaries have taught that there is no greater joy than the resolution of doubt. [corrected by Rabbi Yehuda Spitz, author of reference cited].

== Aggadah ==
=== Happiness and prophecy ===
The Talmud, in an Aggadic (homiletic) teaching, states that the Divine presence does not rest on a prophet unless he is in a state of happiness as the result of fulfilling one of the commandments.

This teaches you that the Divine Presence rests upon man neither through gloom, nor through sloth, nor through frivolity, nor through levity, nor through talk, nor through idle chatter, save through a matter of joy in connection with a mitzvah.

— Talmud, Tractate Shabbos, 30b.

=== Happiness and marriage ===
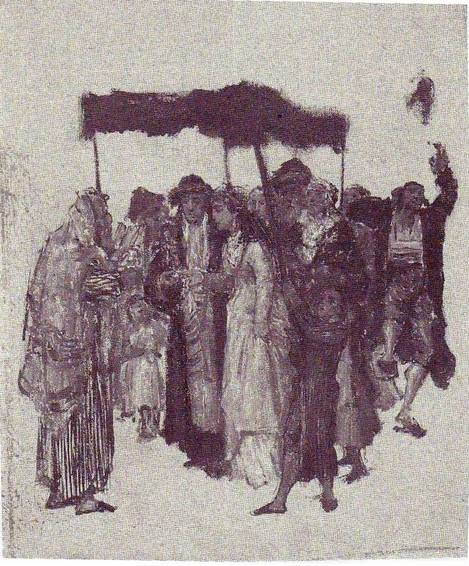
Jewish Wedding (sketch), by Maurycy Gottlieb (1856–1879)

The Talmud and Midrash also associate joy with marriage.

Any man who has no wife lives without joy, without blessing, and without goodness.

— Talmud, Tractate Yevamoth, 62a.

=== Happiness and politics ===
Elsewhere the Midrash emphasises joy as an effect of the state and nature of local governments.

When the righteous achieve great power, there is joy in the world, and when the wicked achieve great power, there is groaning in the world.

— Midrash Rabbah, Esther, IV:i.

== Kabbalah ==
The Zohar, a central text in Kabbalah, states that in order for Man's service of God to be complete, it must be completed in a joyful manner.

The Zohar also notes that the Hebrew word for "in happiness" (b'simcha, Hebrew: בשמחה) contains the same letters as the Hebrew word for "thought" (machshava, Hebrew: מחשבה). This is understood to mean that the key to happiness is found through our minds, by training oneself to weed out any negative thought that prevent one from experiencing happiness.

The Kabbalist Rabbi Elazar ben Moshe Azikri stated “Though a person may be depressed on account of his sins, he must be joyful at the time of Divine service. This applies to every service of God, and how much more so then to the service of prayer which is called ‘the service of the heart.'"

Rabbi Yitzchak Luria, the Arizal, is believed to have only received his wisdom due to his rejoicing in the mitzvoth.

== Hasidism ==
Joy is considered an essential element of the Hasidic way of life. In the early stages of the Hasidic movement, before the name "Hasidim" was coined, one of the names used to refer to the followers of the new movement was di freilicha (Yiddish: די פרייליכע), “the happy ones.”

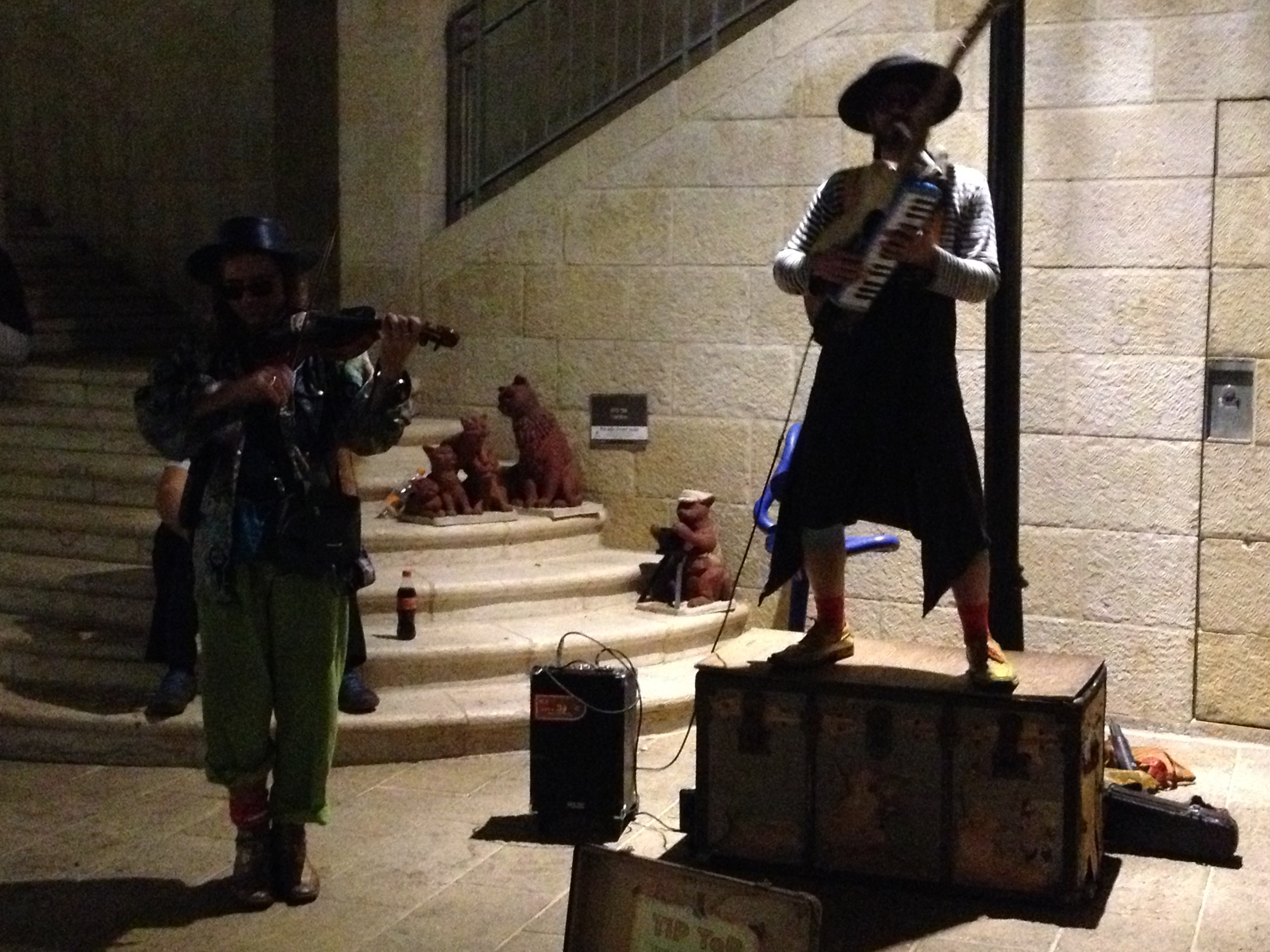
Klezmer musicians in Jerusalem

The founder of Hasidism, Rabbi Yisroel Baal Shem Tov (1698–1760) is quoted as saying "In the eyes of the Hasidim, joy is considered a biblical commandment, a mitzvah." The Hasidic Rebbe, Rabbi Nachman of Breslov (1772–1810) would often say "It is a great mitzvah (commandment) to live in the state of happiness" (mitzvah gedolah lihiyot b'simcha tamid, Hebrew: מצוה גדולה להיות בשמחה תמיד). And Rabbi Aharon of Karlin (I), one of the early Hasidic masters, reportedly said, "There is no mitzvah to be joyous, but joy can bring on the greatest mitzvot." It is also true, he said, that "it is not a sin to be sad, but sadness can bring on the greatest sins."

The Baal Shem Tov interprets the verse "Serve God with happiness", that "The happiness itself is your service of God".

Don’t Be Satisfied! See the reality: God is always with you

— The Lubavitcher Rebbe

In the teachings of Rabbi Schneur Zalman of Liadi, the founder of Chabad Hasidism, happiness is believed to be an essential element in the struggle between the Godly and Animal souls. When a person is sad or depressed, they are likely to feel lethargic and unable to control negative impulses. By contrast, one who is happy is likely to feel energized and motivated to control oneself.

Just as it is with a victory over a physical opponent--for instance, two people who wrestle with each other, each striving to fell the other, if one of them is lazy and sluggish he will easily be defeated and will fall, even if he be stronger than the other--so it is with the conquest of one's evil nature: it is impossible to conquer the evil nature with laziness and sluggishness, which stem from sadness and a stone-like dullness of the heart, but rather with alacrity, which derives from joy and an open heart that is unblemished by any trace of worry and sadness in the world.

— Rabbi Schneur Zalman of Liadi, Tanya, Chapter 26.

The third Chabad Rebbe, Rabbi Menachem Mendel Schneersohn of Lubavitch taught that a person should be happy and remain in good spirits despite any lack in Yirat Shamayim ("fear of heaven"). Though one might consider his/herself wicked and feel he or she deserves some form of divine punishment, one should see no conflict in feeling "happiness... from one side, and bitterness [over his or her spiritual state] from the other side".

According to the Hasidic rebbe, Rabbi Moshe Leib of Sassov (1745–1807), a prayer filled with joy is greater than a prayer filled with tears. Quoting the Talmudic saying "The gates of tears are never locked", Rabbi Moshe states that for tears, the supernal gates are simply unlocked, while joy has the ability to destroy the gates completely.

The Baal Shem Tov taught that prayer conducted with joy is greater than prayer conducted with tears. The Baal Shem also taught that when the Tzadikim of the generation are joyful they awaken joy in the entire world, and that anger is dispelled by an emphasis on love for God and joy in performing the commandments.

== Mussar ==
According to Rabbi Yisroel Salanter, founder of the Mussar movement, a person may be able to conquer and rectify one's negative impulses by being joyful in his or her service to God.

According to Rabbi Naftali Amsterdam "Mussar study in ecstasy (b'hispaalus) renews the heart and gives joy to the soul."

According to Rabbi Eliyahu Eliezer Dessler "There is no happiness in the world of material things; there is only happiness in spiritual concerns. The one who enjoys a rich spiritual life is happy. There is no other kind of happiness in existence."

== Other rabbinic sources ==
Rabbi Chaim Volozhin taught "A person in a joyful mood can learn more in an hour than a depressed person can learn in many hours."

== Methods ==
According to Rabbi Schneur Zalman of Liadi, the first Chabad Rebbe, one may attain joy by thinking deeply and picturing in one's mind the subject of the unity of God.

According to Rabbi Menachem Mendel Schneersohn, the third Chabad Rebbe, by assuming the demeanor and mannerisms of one who is joyful, even if the one practicing these actions does not feel happy, such behaviors will lead to true feelings of happiness, because behaviors and actions impact the heart.

According to Rabbi Nachman of Breslov, forcing oneself to be happy leads to truly feeling happy. According to Rabbi Nachman, even a faked, ungenuine, happiness has the power to transform one's personal situation and lead him or her to experiencing genuine joy.

=== How Happiness Thinks ===
In 2014, the Jewish Learning Institute, a Chabad organization offering classes in Jewish education for adults, launched a six-part course titled How Happiness Thinks. The course was planned to be delivered in 350 cities worldwide, to over 75,000 students. The material in the lessons is drawn from Jewish sources as well as positive psychology addressing the concept of happiness, methods of its attainment as well as possible barriers to experiencing joy.

The JLI happiness course focuses on one's self-concept and how self-centered ness and low self-esteem negatively impact one's experience of happiness, while humility is seen as a tool in increasing feelings of joy in life. The lessons also examine how stress over everyday worries can hinder feelings of happiness, and finding purpose and meaning in life are believed to make people happier.

=== Happiness and Positive Psychology ===
Professor Tal Ben-Shahar (PhD), one of the leaders in the field of Positive Psychology and the instructor of the most popular course in the history of Harvard University, entitled Positive Psychology 1504, explains that "many of the ideas quote-unquote 'discovered' by modern psychologists, had actually been present for thousands of years in traditional Jewish sources." In a production produced by Aish HaTorah and Jerusalem U entitled "Habits of Happiness: Positive Psychology and Judaism", Professor Ben-Shahar discusses the age-old links between happiness and Judaism through the lens of Positive Psychology.

== See also ==
- Anger in Judaism
- Happiness
- Jewish philosophy
- Religion and happiness
