= Singam (name) =

Singam or Singham is both a surname and a given name that means "lion" in the Tamil language. Notable people with the name include:

- Archibald Singham (1932-1991), Sri Lankan political scientist and historian
- Constance Singam (born 1936), Singaporean activist and writer
- Neville Roy Singham (born 1954), American businessman
- Singam Singh (born 1988), Indian footballer
