= Simcha =

Simcha (Hebrew: שִׂמְחָה śimḥāʰ; Hebrew pronunciation: [simˈχa], Yiddish pronunciation: [ˈsɪmχə]) is a Hebrew word that means "gladness", or "joy", and is often used as a given name.

== Uses ==
The concept of simcha is an important one in Jewish philosophy. A popular teaching by Rabbi Nachman of Breslov, a 19th-century Chassidic Rabbi, is "Mitzvah Gedolah Le'hiyot Besimcha Tamid", "it is a great mitzvah (commandment) to always be in a state of happiness". When a person is happy one is much more capable of serving God and going about one's daily activities than when depressed or upset.

Jews often use simcha in its capacity as a Hebrew and Yiddish noun meaning festive occasion. The term is used for any happy occasion, such as a wedding, bar mitzvah or engagement.

=== Holidays ===
The day of Simchat Torah, "Rejoice in the Law", marks the completion and beginning of the annual cycle of reading the Torah.

=== Other uses ===
Simcha is also the name of a kosher beer from Saxony, Germany, and it was also a slang term used in Jewish-American organized crime circles to refer to a pimp.

Members of the Chabad movement sometimes use the word Simcha (abbreviated as "S.") when referring to place names that begin with the word "Saint", in order to avoid what they believe is idolatry. For example, some Jews may refer to the city of Santa Monica, California, as "Simcha Monica" or "S. Monica".

== Name ==
Simcha is also used as a given name, for men or women. In the Ashkenazi Jewish tradition, the name Simcha is most likely to be used for a boy, while in the Sephardic/Israeli tradition it would be a girl's name.

== See also ==
- Religion and happiness
- Happiness in Judaism
