= Rosera =

Rosera Rusera Ghat
- Town
- Nicknames: Rusera, Rusera Ghat
- Interactive map of Rosera
- Coordinates: 25°45′18″N 86°01′27″E
- Country: India
- State: Bihar
- Region: Mithila
- District: Samastipur
- Lok Sabha constituencies: Samastipur
- Vidhan Sabha constituencies: Rosera

Population (2011)
  - Total: 13 Lakh+
- Time zone: UTC+5:30 (IST)
- PIN: 848210
- Telephone code: 06275

Rosera is a city (subdivision) on the bank of River Budhi Gandak. It is a municipality in Samastipur district in the Indian state of Bihar. Rosera block consists of 48 villages. Rosera is well connected by the rest of the country through railway or road network. Rosera is connected to Begusarai district via SH-55 and Darbhanga district via SH-88 and it's approx 120 km from Capital Patna.

== Demographics ==
As per 2011 India census, Rosera has a population of 31,155. Males constituted 53% of the population and females 47%. Rosera had an average literacy rate of 69%: male literacy was 70%, and female literacy 68.5%. 16% of the population were under 6 years of age.

== Government ==
Prayag Mandal, Independent, defeated Ramashay Rai of Indian National Congress in 1977. Ramashray Rai of Congress defeated Ram Lakhan Singh of Janata Party (SC) in 1980. Bhola Mandal of Lok Dal defeated Satyendra Narain Choudhary of Congress in 1985. Gajendra Prasad Singh of Janata Dal defeated Ramashray Roy of Congress in 1995 and Rama Kant Jha of Congress in 1990. Ashok Kumar of Samajwadi Party defeated Gajendra Prasad Singh of RJD in 2000. Gajendra Prasad Singh of Rashtriya Janata Dal defeated Ashok Kumar of Janata Dal in October 2005 and February 2005. In the 2010 state assembly elections, Manju Hajari of BJP won the Rosera seat defeating her nearest rival Pitamber Paswan of RJD. In the 2015 state assembly elections, Dr. Ashok Ram won from congress party in collaboration with Mahagathbandhan and defeated Manju Hajari. In 2020 General election Bhartiya Janata Party candidate Birendra Kumar won.

== Economy ==
Rosera is a trading centre due to its location, situated on the trade route of the river Budhi Gandak. Rosera is an active business hub for lychee, jewellery, carpets, clothing, medicine and agriculture.

=== Agriculture ===
Rosera with multiple rivers flowing through, is rich in agriculture because of its fertile plain. The main crops are tobacco, maize, rice and wheat. Leechi and Mango fruits are grown in abundance. Sugarcanes are also produced in Rosera and sent to the Hasanpur chini mill for processing.

=== Businesses ===
Rosera was famous for wooden kamandalu used by Hindu sages for keeping water, though the art vanished with the death of the carpenter Jangal Mistree and Gulten Mistree.

Rosera has been a hub for spices in the past due to its location near the tributary of River Gandak. In modern times, along with flour mills, Rosera has numerous clothing shops. Many branded showrooms are also being set up, making it more urbanized. The main market of Rosera is the Mahavir Chowk on the Station Road.

== Villages ==
- Bhirha
- Naya Nagar

== Notable people ==
- Anukul Roy (Indian Cricketer)

== Transport ==
Rosera is well connected with other part of state through State Highway 55 and State Highway 88. It also has a broad gauge railway station, Rusera Ghat railway station, with direct train service to Delhi. Rosera has bus services to Patna, Ranchi, Samastipur, Darbhanga, Muzzafarpur and Delhi also.
