= Sinha =

Surname in the Indian subcontinent

Sinha is a surname which originates in the Indian subcontinent. The surname is commonly used by many communities including the Bengali Kayastha and the Chitraguptavanshi Kayasthas of the Hindi Belt, and is common in Bangladesh, India, Nepal and Sri Lanka. It comes from a Sanskrit word meaning "lion" or "brave person".

== Usage ==
=== Indian subcontinent ===
In India, Sinha is commonly used as a surname by the Kayasthas of the West Bengal and Bihar.

In Sri Lanka, the term 'Sinha' (or Siha/Sinhe/Singhe/Singha/Singho) has commonly been used by the Sinhalese (or Sinhala). When it comes to the term 'Sinhala' itself, the first part of the word, 'Sinha' stands for lion while 'la' or 'le' stands for blood, giving the meaning 'Lion's blood'. The word Simhmam (or Singam / Singham / Singhai / Singai) is the Sri Lankan Tamil derivative. In northeast India, Sinhas held high positions as advisors during the times of the Mughal Empire. In northern and middle part of India as well as southern India Sinhraj/Sinharaj/Sinharaja or Rajasinha is also used, having the meaning Lion/Leo king.

The more common surname Singh in India has the same root. Jayasinghe and other surnames like 'Wijesinghe', 'Weerasingha', 'Edirisinghe', 'Singaiariyan' in Sri Lanka may also share this root.

=== Brazil ===
Sinha is also an unrelated name found in Brazil. "Sinhá moça" is a Brazilian colloquialism that may be translated "miss" or "missy".

== Notable persons with the surname Sinha ==
- Akhoury Purnendu Bhusan Sinha (1928–2021), Indian solid state chemist
- Amara Sinha (c. AD 375), Sanskrit grammarian and poet
- Anindya Sinha, Indian primatologist
- Anubhav Sinha (b. 1965), Indian film director
- Anugrah Narayan Sinha (1887–1957), Indian politician
- Anupam Sinha, Raj Comics artist
- Badri Narain Sinha (1930-1979), Indian Police Service officer
- Basawon Singh (Sinha) (1909–1989), Indian nationalist and freedom fighter
- Bejoy Kumar Sinha (1909–1992), Indian revolutionary
- Bidya Sinha Saha Mim, Bangladeshi film actress
- Bikash Sinha (1945–2023) Indian physicist, Padma Bhusan awardee
- Gayatri Sinha, Indian art critic and curator based in New Delhi
- Gunjan Sinha (b. 1967), Indian-American entrepreneur and business executive
- Indra Sinha (b. 1950), Indian/British author
- J. K. Sinha, Indian Police Service officer
- Jagmohanlal Sinha (1920–2008), Indian lawyer, former judge
- Kaliprasanna Sinha (1841(?)–1870), also known as Hootum Pyancha, Bengali author, playwright, and philanthropist
- Krityunjai Prasad Sinha, Indian theoretical physicist
- Kumares C. Sinha, Indian-American engineer, researcher, and educator
- Mala Sinha (b. 1936), Indian actress
- Man Mohan Sinha (1933–2018), Air Marshal I.A.F
- Maniklal Sinha (1916–1994), Indian writer, novelist, historian, Archaeologist
- Manjul Sinha, Indian television director
- Manodeb Sinha, Indian politician
- Manoj Sinha (b. 1959), Indian politician, Ghazipur
- Mizanur Rahman Sinha (1943–2026), Bangladeshi politician
- Mukul Sinha, Indian human rights lawyer
- Nirmal Chandra Sinha (1911–1997), Indian Tibetologist and author
- Paul Sinha (b. 1970) British Bengali stand-up comedian, general practitioner, and professional quizzer
- Raja Radhika Raman Sinha (1937–2008), Indian civil engineer and a writer of Hindi literature
- Rameshwar Prasad Sinha (d. 1965), Indian politician
- Ranjit Sinha (1953–2021), Indian police officer and former Director of the Central Bureau of Investigation
- Rashmi Sinha (b. 1960), Indian businesswoman, CEO of SlideShare
- Ratan Kumar Sinha (b. 1951), Indian nuclear scientist and mechanical engineer
- Ravindra Kumar Sinha (b. 1954), Indian biologist and environmentalist
- Sachidanand Sinha (1871–1950), Indian lawyer, statesman, administrator, and educationist
- Sandali Sinha (b. 1971), Indian actress
- Sarat Chandra Sinha (1914–2005), Indian writer and politician
- Satyendra Narayan Sinha (1917–2006), Indian politician
- Satyendra Prasanna Sinha, 1st Baron Sinha (1863–1928), Indian lawyer and statesman
- Shantha Sinha, Indian professor and activist
- Sharda Sinha (1952–2024), Indian folk and classical singer
- Shatrughan Sinha (b. 1946), Indian actor and politician
- Shumona Sinha (b. 1973), naturalised French writer born in Calcutta
- Siddharth Sinha, Indian filmmaker
- Smrity Sinha (b. 1989), Indian film actress
- Sonakshi Sinha, Indian actress and model
- Sri Krishna Sinha (1887–1962), Indian nationalist known as Bihar Kesari, first Chief Minister of Bihar
- Srinivas Kumar Sinha (1926–2016), Indian politician and military officer
- Surajit Chandra Sinha (1926–2002), Indian anthropologist
- Surendra Kumar Sinha (b. 1951), Bangladeshi lawyer and jurist
- Tapan Sinha (1924–2009), Indian and Bengali film director, Dadasaheb Phalke and Padma Shri awardee
- Tapan Sinha (admiral), Indian admiral
- Tarak Sinha (1950–2021), Indian cricket coach
- Toshi Sinha, Indian voice actress
- U K Sinha (b. 1952), Indian businessman and politician
- Vidya Sinha (1947–2019), Indian film and television actress
- Yashvardhan Kumar Sinha (b. 1958), Indian diplomat
- Yashwant Sinha (b. 1937), Indian politician

== Fictional characters ==
- Akash Sinha and Siddharth Sinha in Armaan (2003 film)
- Baldev Sinha, Shanti Sinha, and Virender Sinha in Soldier (1998 Indian film)
- Professor Sinha's five daughters in Kahiin To Hoga (soap opera)
- Shekher Sinha, Sandhaya Sinha, and Jai Sinha in Dil Jo Bhi Kahey... (2005 film)
- Siddharth Sinha in Dil Chahta Hai (2001 film)
- Vikram Sinha in Krrish (2006 film)

== Places named after Sinha ==
- Sigiriya, fortress in Sri Lanka; its short name derives from 'Sinha Giriya' meaning "The rocky place of lions"
- Singapore, named from 'Singa Pura' / 'Sinha Pure', which means Lion City in Sanskrit, before 1819
