= Samastipur =

City and Municipal Corporation in Mithila region of Bihar, India

- City
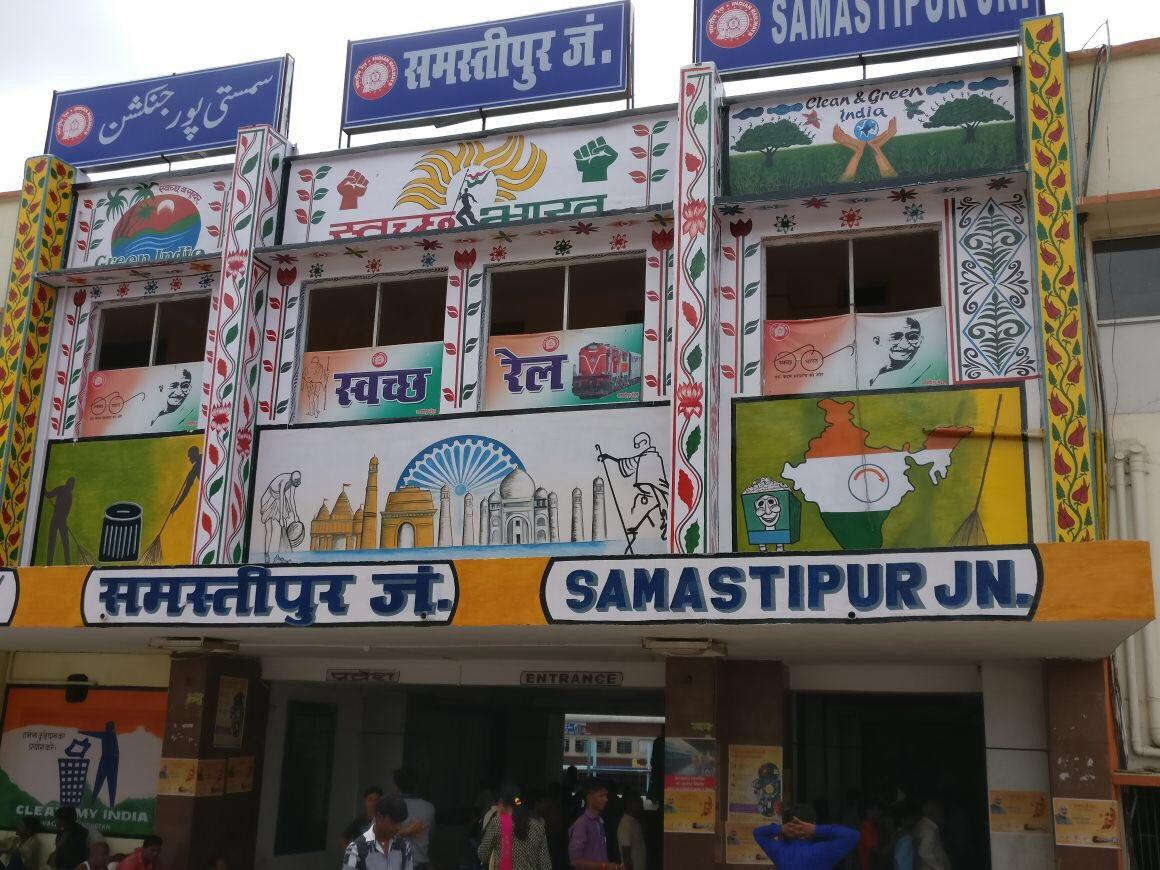
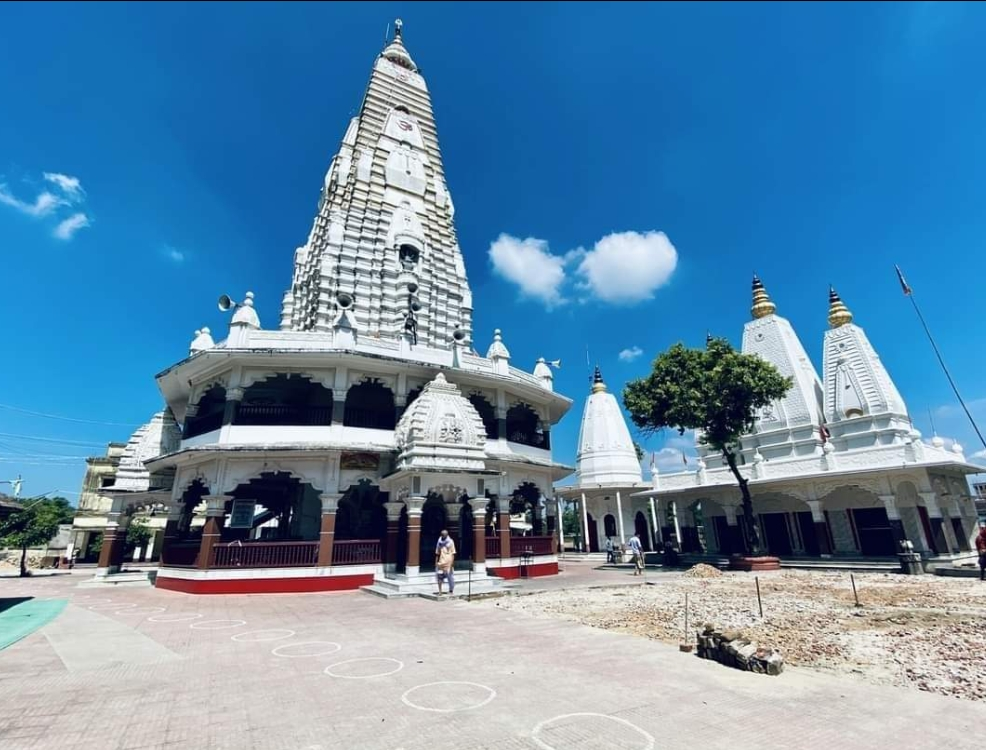
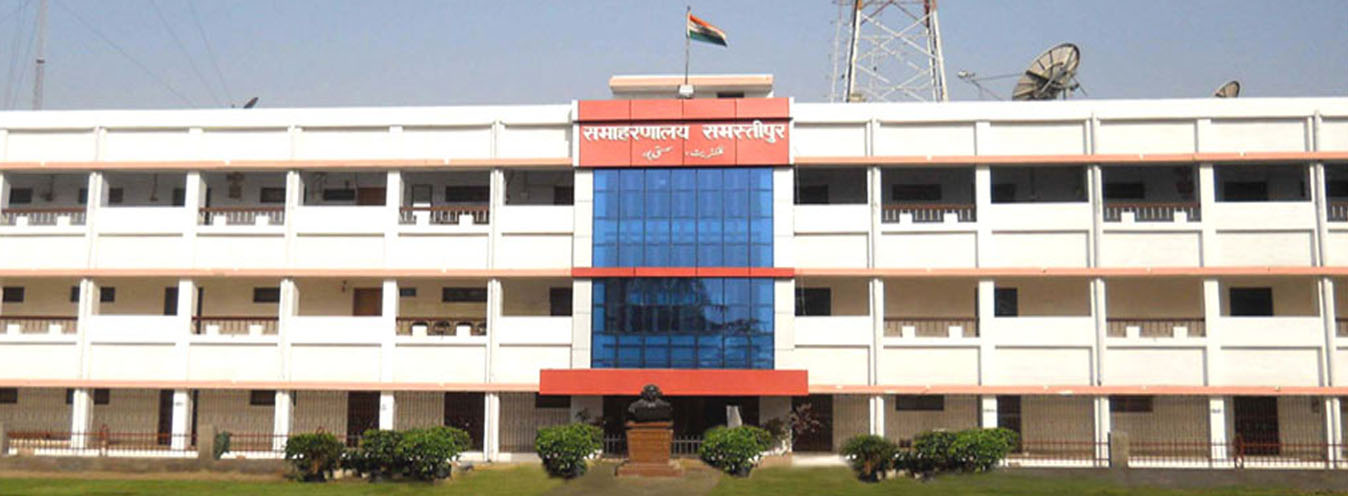
- From top, left to right: Samastipur Junction; Thaneshwar Asthan Temple; Khudneshwar Dham Temple; Collectorate Office Samastipur

- Location within Bihar
- Coordinates: 25°51′47″N 85°46′52″E
- Country: India
- State: Bihar
- Region: Mithila
- Division: Darbhanga
- District: Samastipur

Government
  - Type: Municipal Corporation
  - Body: Samastipur Municipal Corporation
  - Mayor: Anita Ram
  - Deputy Mayor: Rambalak Paswan
  - Municipal Commissioner: Bibhuti Ranjan Choudhary (B.A.S)

Area
  - Total: 155 km^{2} (60 sq mi)
- Elevation: 46.54 m (152.7 ft)

Population (2011)
  - Total: 253,136
  - Rank: 10th (Bihar); 177th (India)
  - Density: 1,630/km^{2} (4,230/sq mi)
- Demonym: Maithil

Language
  - Official: Hindi
  - Additional Official: Urdu
  - Regional Language: Maithili
- Time zone: UTC+5.30 (IST)
- PIN: 848101
- Telephone Code: 06274
- Vehicle registration: BR-33
- Lok Sabha constituency: Samastipur
- Vidhan Sabha constituency: Samastipur
- HDI: ▲554 (medium)
- Website: samastipur.nic.in samastipurnagarnigam.net

Samastipur is a city and a Municipal Corporation in Bihar, India. It is the headquarters of the Samastipur district and comes under Darbhanga division. The Burhi Gandak River flows through the city. It is one of the five railway divisions of ECR, Hajipur. The Samastipur Junction railway station is one of the busiest stations in North Bihar after Patna and Katihar.

== Demographics ==
As of 2011 Indian Census, Samastipur had a total population of 62,935, of which 33,025 were males and 29,910 were females. Population within the age group of 0 to 6 years was 8,252. The total number of literates in Samastipur was 46,416, which constituted 73.8% of the population with male literacy of 77.2% and female literacy of 69.9%. The effective literacy rate of 7+ population of Samastipur was 84.9%, of which male literacy rate was 88.9% and female literacy rate was 80.4%. The Scheduled Castes and Scheduled Tribes population was 9,219 and 249 respectively. Samastipur had 12062 households in 2011.

== Education ==
Samastipur has several schools and colleges. Most of the colleges are affiliated to the Lalit Narayan Mithila University, Darbhanga.

The Dr. Rajendra Prasad Central Agriculture University, is located near the town, in Pusa. This university was constructed in 1970 near the ruins of Pusa Institute which was the Indian Agricultural Research Institute built during the British regime.

AHS Nursing College & Hospital is a nursing college established in 2023, situated in Tajpur Road, Sub Division Samastipur, affiliated with the Bihar University of Health Sciences and Bihar Nurses Registration Council.

IGNOU has several study centres in Samastipur.

== Transport ==
=== Road ===
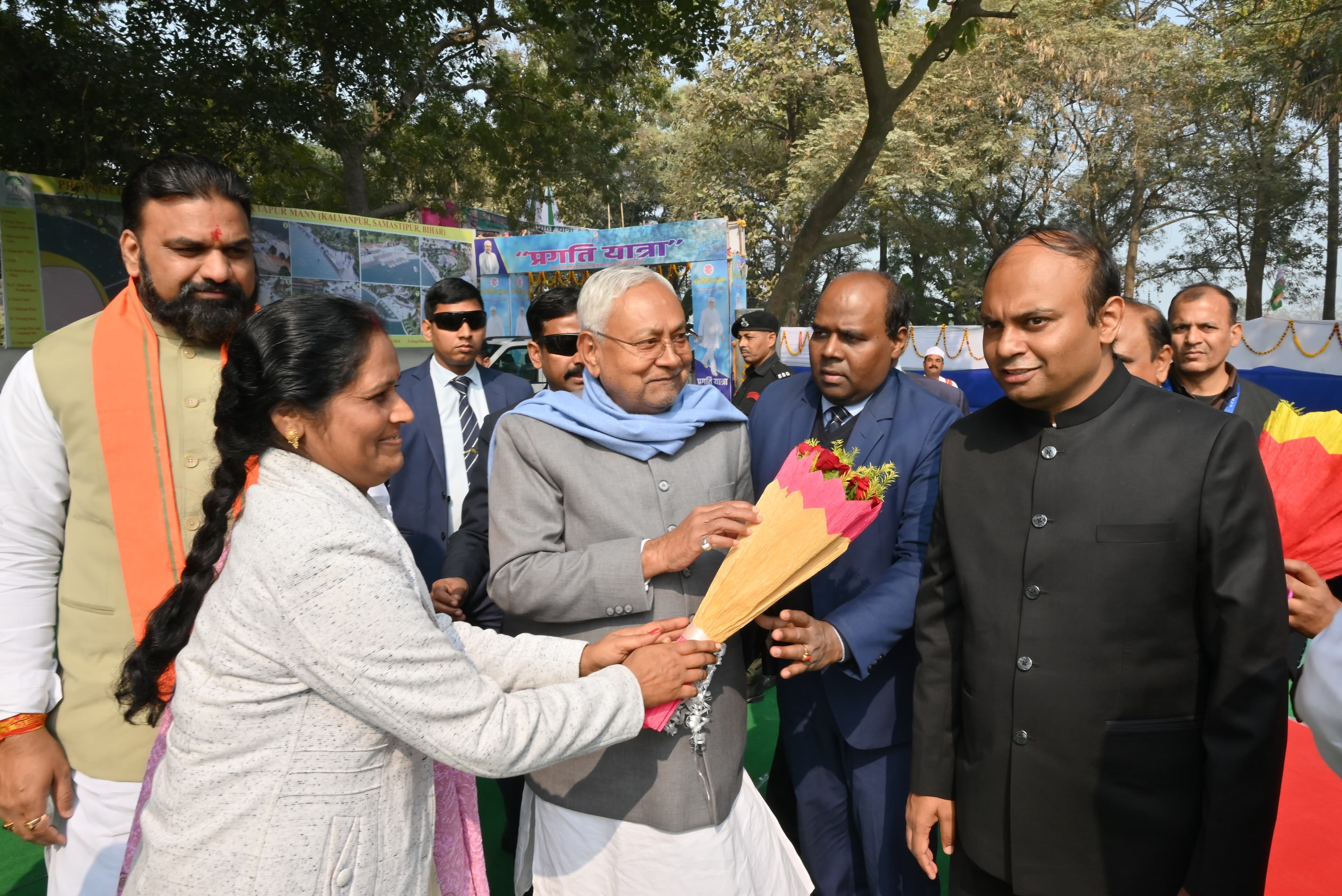
CM Nitish Kumar laid the foundation stone of ROB construction work on NH-322 in Samastipur with Deputy Chief Minister Samrat Choudhary and Samastipur District Magistrate Raushan Kushwaha.

Bihar State Road Transport Corporation (B.S.R.T.C) operates bus services to the neighbouring states of Jharkhand, West Bengal and Uttar Pradesh.

=== Rail ===
Samastipur Junction railway station lies in the East Central Railway zone of the Indian Railway network and provides connectivity to most of the regions of India.

== History ==
Samastipur became a district in 1972 when it was split from Darbhanga district.

Samastipur consists of four sub-divisions:

1. Rosera
2. Samastipur
3. Dalsinghsarai
4. Shahpur Patori

Historically, the Samastipur district has been dominated by Koeri, Yadav and Dusadh castes. There is also a sizeable presence of Bhumihars in some of the regions, but they wield less political influence, as they are not united politically. For this reason, most of the total ten assembly constituencies falling in this district has been dominated by Koeris. The two Lok Sabha constituencies, which are part of this district are also dominated by Koeris and Dusadhs. It has been recorded that in this district, the Koeri and Bhumihar castes are indulged in criminality, as they are politically strong.

== Demographics ==
Religions in Samastipur district (2011)
Religion	Percent
Hinduism	89.18%
Islam	10.62%
Other or not stated	0.20%

According to the 2011 census Samastipur district has a population of 4,261,566, roughly equal to the Republic of the Congo or the US state of Kentucky. This gives it a ranking of 45th in India (out of a total of 640). The district has a population density of 1,467 inhabitants per square kilometre (3,800/sq mi). Its population growth rate over the decade 2001-2011 was 25.53%. Samastipur has a sex ratio of 911 females for every 1000 males, and a literacy rate of 61.86%. 3.47% of the population lives in urban areas. Scheduled Castes and Scheduled Tribes make up 18.85% and 0.04% of the population respectively.

Languages of Samstipur district (2011)
1. Hindi (52.3%)
2. Maithili (30.8%)
3. Urdu (8.40%)
4. 'Other' Hindi (8.29%)
5. Others (0.20%)

At the time of the 2011 Census of India, 52.32% of the population in the district spoke Hindi, 30.79% Maithili and 8.40% Urdu as their first language. 8.29% of the population recorded their language as 'Others' under Hindi.

== Notable people ==
- Bali Ram Bhagat, 6th Speaker of Lok Sabha, Governor of Rajasthan, Governor of Himachal Pradesh and former Member of parliament
- Gajendra Prasad Himanshu, politician
- Syed Shahnawaz Hussain, Indian politician, national spokesperson of Bharatiya Janata Party and a cabinet minister
- Ram Balak Singh Kushwaha, two term Member of Bihar Legislative Assembly
- Roshan Kushwaha, Indian Administrative Service officer, District Magistrate of Samastipur.
- Anukul Roy, Indian cricketer
- Shilpa Singh, Indian singer, dancer, model and beauty pageant titleholder
- Vivekanand Sinha, Inspector General of Police, Bastar range, Chhattisgarh.
- Vaibhav Sooryavanshi, Indian cricketer
- Karpoori Thakur, politician and independence activist

== Villages ==
- Gorgama
- Kaina
- Umaidpur
- Oini
