= Singh =

Surname originating from Asia

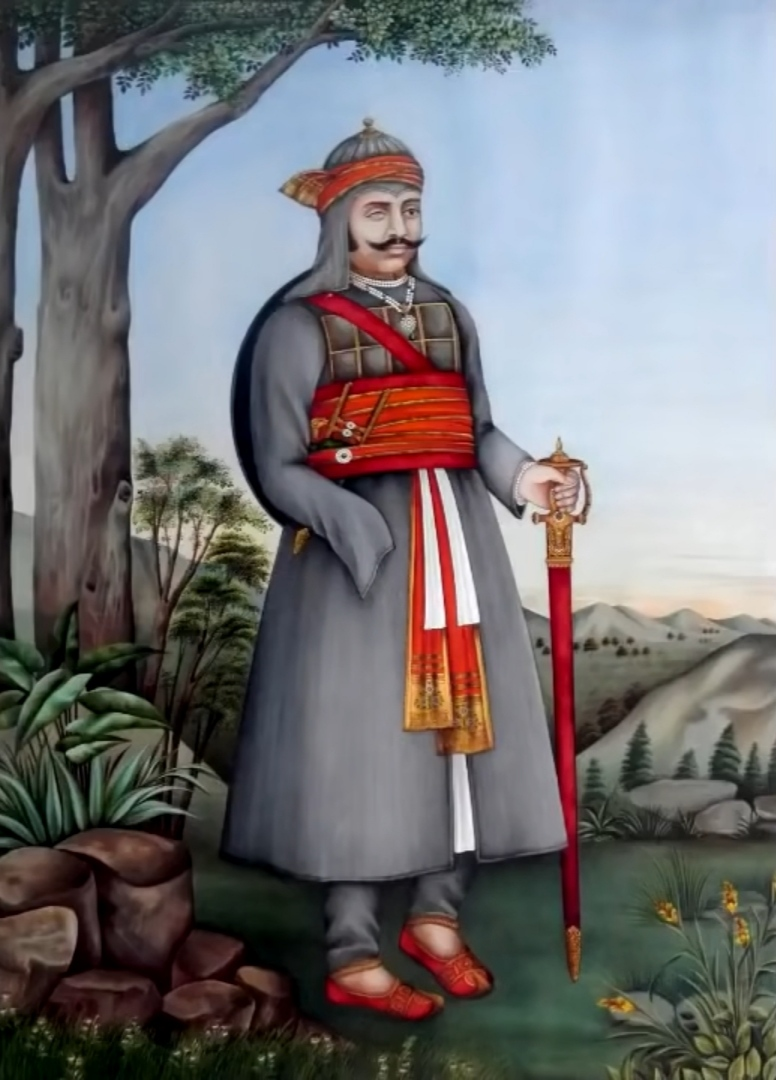
Rajput ruler Rana Sangram Singh (1482-1528).

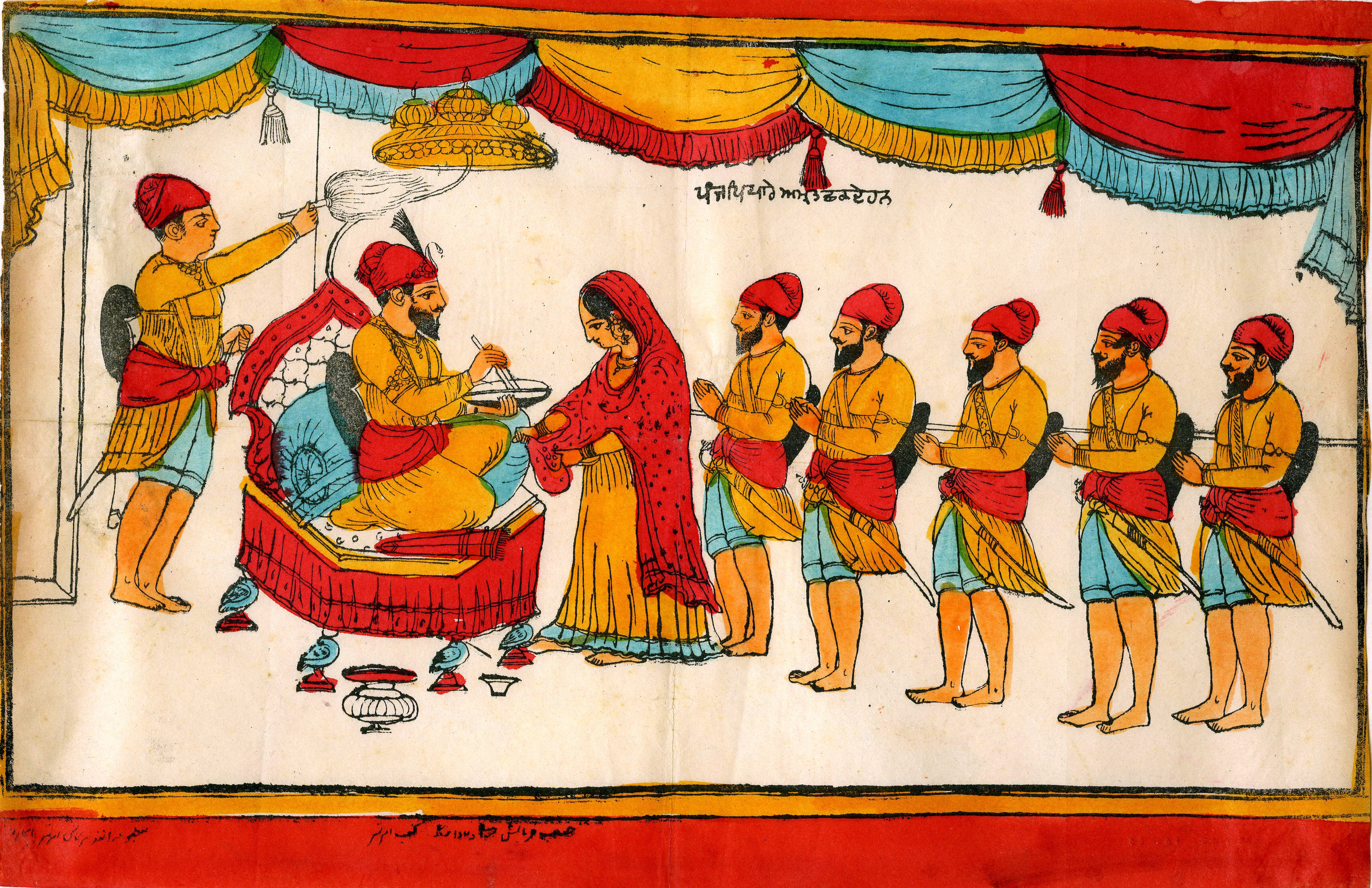
Creation of the Khalsa by Sikh Guru Gobind Singh, 1699 CE.

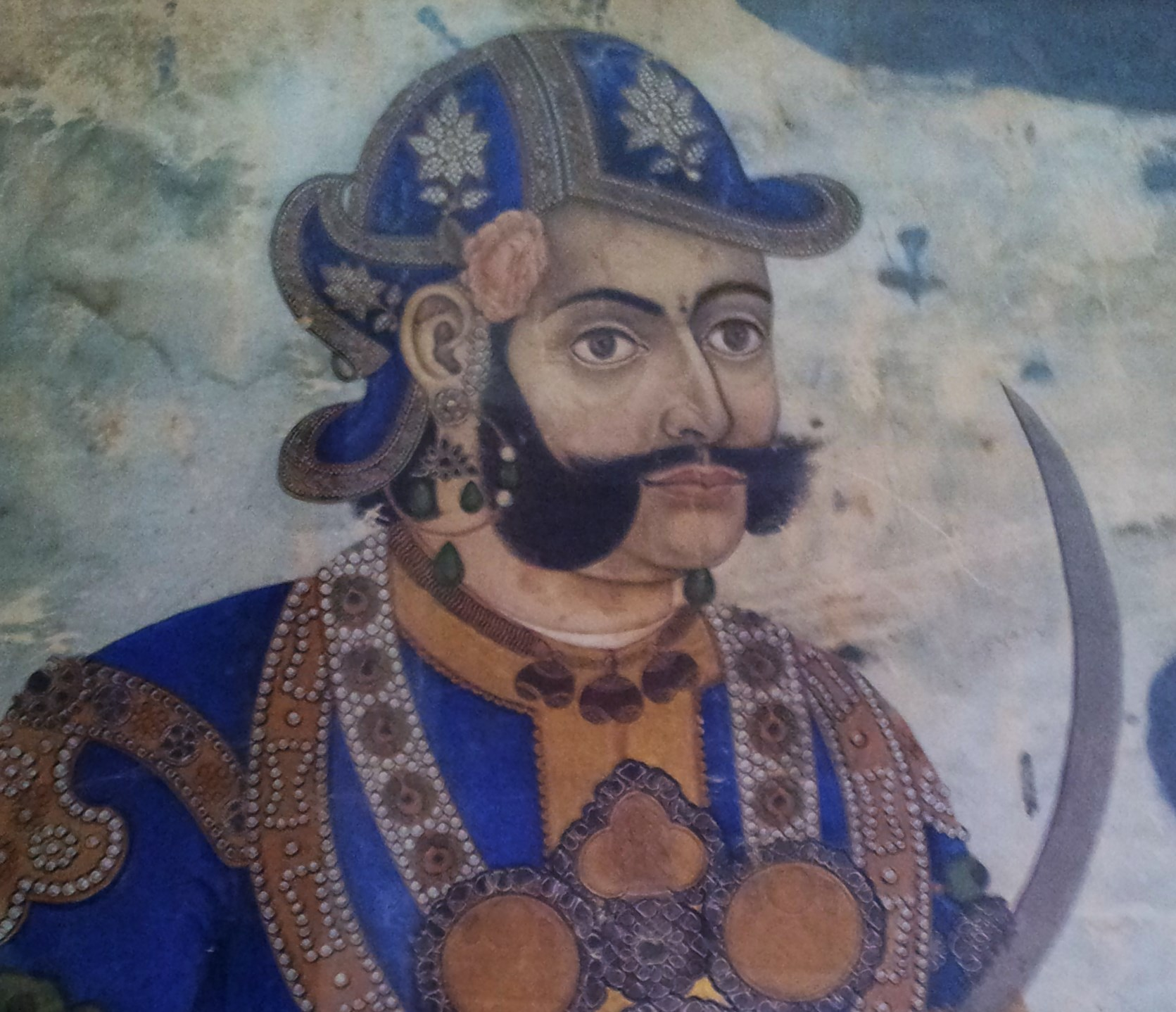
Prime Minister of Nepal and Commander-in-Chief of the Nepalese Army, Mukhtiyar Mathabar Singh Thapa, (1843-1845) of the Chhetri Thapa dynasty.

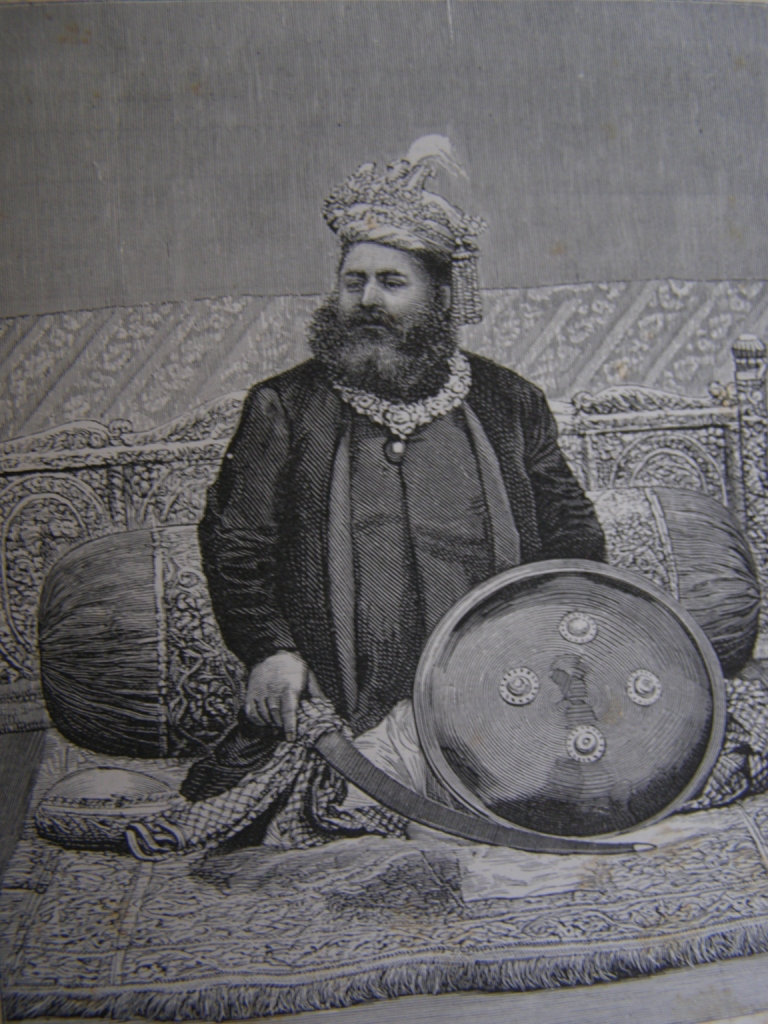
Maharaja Lakshmeshwar Singh of Raj Darbhanga in Bihar, published in Graphic Magazine, December 1888.

Singh (IPA: /ˈsɪŋ/ SING) is a title, middle name, or surname that means "lion" in various South Asian and Southeast Asian communities. Traditionally used by the Hindu Kshatriya community, it was later mandated in the late 17th century by Guru Gobind Singh (born Gobind Das) for all male Sikhs as well, in part as a rejection of caste-based prejudice and to emulate Rajput naming conventions. As a surname or a middle name, it is now found throughout the world across communities and religious groups, becoming more of a generic, caste-neutral, decorative name—similar to names such as Kumar and Lal.

== Etymology and variations ==
The word Singh is derived from the Sanskrit word सिंह (IAST: siṃha) meaning 'lion', and is used to convey 'hero' or 'eminent person'.

Several variants of the word are found in other languages:

- In Meitei (officially called Manipuri), it is written and pronounced as "Singh" (Meitei: ꯁꯤꯡꯍ). It is used as a name suffix (after the given name or middle name) by the Meitei kings of medieval and early modern Manipur, as well as by the vast majority of the menfolk populace of the Meitei Hindu community, in Manipur, Assam, Tripura and Bangladesh.
- In Tibetan, it is written as སིང་ with the same pronunciation.
- In Tamil, the word for lion is Singham or Singhe written as சிங்க, also derived from Sanskrit.
- In Burmese, it is spelled သီဟ (thiha), derived from the Pali variant siha.
- In Urdu, it is written as سِنگھ with the same pronunciation as Hindi. Variations include Simha and Sinha in Bihar.
- In Indonesian, it is written as Singa and it means 'lion'.

== History ==
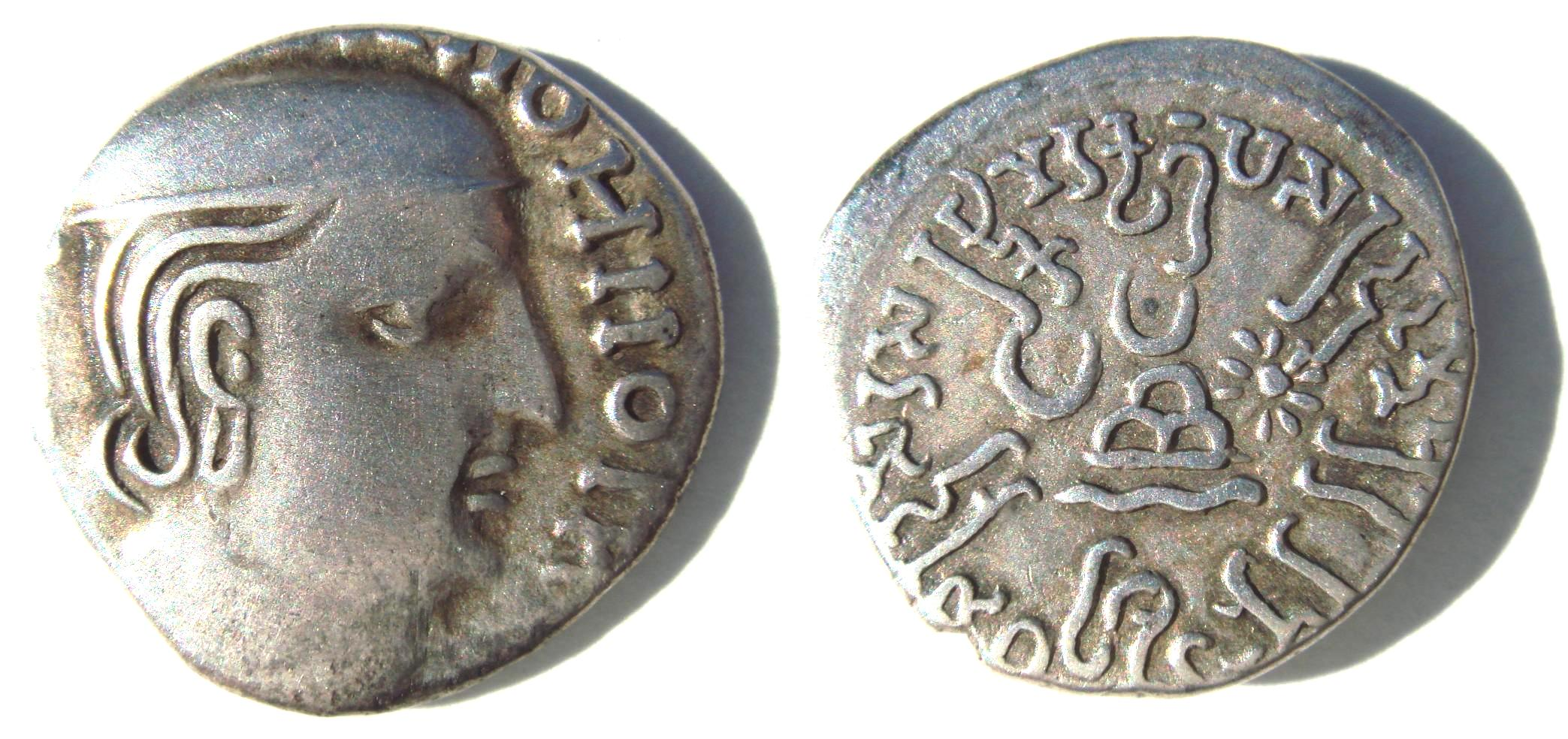
Coin of the Western Kshatrapa ruler Rudrasimha I (178 to 197 CE) who used "Simha" as suffix.

Originally, the Sanskrit word for lion, variously transliterated as Simha or Singh, was used as a title by Kshatriya warriors in northern parts of India. The earliest recorded examples of names ending with "Simha" are the names of the two sons of Rudraraman, who ruled the Western Satraps in the second century CE. Jayasimha, the first ruler of the Chalukya dynasty to bear the title Simha, ruled around 500 CE. The Vengi branch of the Chalukyas continued using Simha as a last name until the eleventh century. The Rajputs started using Singh in preference to the classical epithet of "Varman". Among the Rajputs, the use of the word Singh came into vogue among the Paramaras of Malwa in 10th century CE, among the Guhilots and the Kachwahas of Narwar in the 12th century CE, and the Rathores of Marwar after the 17th century.

By the sixteenth century, "Singh" had become a popular surname among Rajputs. It was adopted by the Sikhs in 1699, as per the instructions of Guru Gobind Singh. Singh is used by all baptized male Sikhs, regardless of their geographical or cultural binding; the women use Kaur. Guru Gobind Singh introduced the surname "Singh" for Sikh men to foster equality and unity within the community. This move aimed to eliminate caste distinctions and promote a fearless and righteous identity. By adopting "Singh," Sikh men were encouraged to live as saint-soldiers, embodying courage, justice, and a commitment to serving humanity, According to Pashaura Singh, the Guru gave male Sikhs the name "Singh", which was associated with aristocracy, to imitate the traditions of the Rajput hill chiefs near Anandpur Sahib. Evidence found within Bhai Jaita's Sri Gur Katha suggest that the title Singh was used by the Sikhs in the period leading up to the Battle of Bhangani, with the guru officiating the title for the Sikhs with the formalization of the Khalsa, popularly accepted as occurring in the year 1699.

In the 18th century, several groups started using the title "Singh". These included the Brahmins, the Kayasthas and the Baniyas of what are now Uttar Pradesh and Bihar. In the 19th century, even the Bengal court peons of the lower castes adopted the title "Singh". Bhumihars, who originally used Brahmin surnames, also started affixing Singh to their names. In Bihar and Jharkhand, the surname came to be associated with power and authority, and was adopted by people of multiple castes, including Brahmin zamindars. Citing Kshatriya status, numerous communities use 'Singh' as part of their names. Some Jains have also adopted the surname in addition to various Hindu castes.

Many Muslim Shins historically used the surname "Sing", the earlier form of the name, "Simha", was frequently appended to names found in the Gilgit Manuscripts, a corpus of Buddhist texts and the oldest surviving manuscripts in India, discovered in the Gilgit region of Kashmir.

People belonging to several other castes and communities also started using Singh as a title, middle name or a surname; these include non-Sikh Punjabis, Charans, Yadavs, Gurjars, Brahmins, Marathas, Jats, Kushwahas, Rajpurohits, Kumawats etc. Dalit and other backward groups have also adopted the name, including the Bhils, Koeris, and Dusadhs. The name is also found among the Indian diaspora.

== Usage ==
"Singh" is generally used as a surname or as a middle name/title. When used as a middle name, it is generally followed by the caste, clan or family name. To reduce caste discrimination, some Sikhs append "Khalsa" or their native village names to Singh.

Originally, a common practice among the Rajput men was to have "Singh" as their last name, while Rajput women had the last name 'Kanwar'. However, now, many Rajput women have Singh in their name as well.

=== Nepal ===
Singh is a common name in Nepal; the appellation has acquired caste-neutral status due to its wide scale adoption by many members of Nepali society. Some notable examples of Nepalis with the middle name/surname Singh are: Amar Singh Thapa, Ranodip Singh, and Pratap Singh Shah.

=== Outside South Asia ===
Singh is a common Hindu name in Guyana. Some Indian immigrants to British Guiana are believed to have adopted surnames traditionally associated with high caste status, including Sharma and Tiwari (Brahmin), as well as Singh (Kshatriya).

Around a million adherents of Sikhism that live in Western countries only keep Singh or Kaur as their last name. This has caused problems with immigration applications, especially to Canada. For a decade, the Canadian High Commission in New Delhi stated in letters to its Sikh clients that "the names Kaur and Singh do not qualify for the purpose of immigration to Canada", with the effect of requiring people with these surnames to adopt another name (such as one historically used in their family). When the World Sikh Organization raised the issue with Citizenship and Immigration Canada in 2007, the department announced a day later that it was dropping the policy and admitted that it had used a "poorly worded" form letter. The department denied that its intent was to ask applicants to change their names, a claim which an immigration lawyer condemned as outrageous and reminiscent of post-colonial Anglicization for administrative convenience.

== See also ==
- List of people with surname Singh
- Singh v Canada, a Supreme Court of Canada case on the applicability of Charter rights to refugee claimants
- Kaur
