= Lala Kamlapat Singhania =

Indian industrialist (1884–1937)

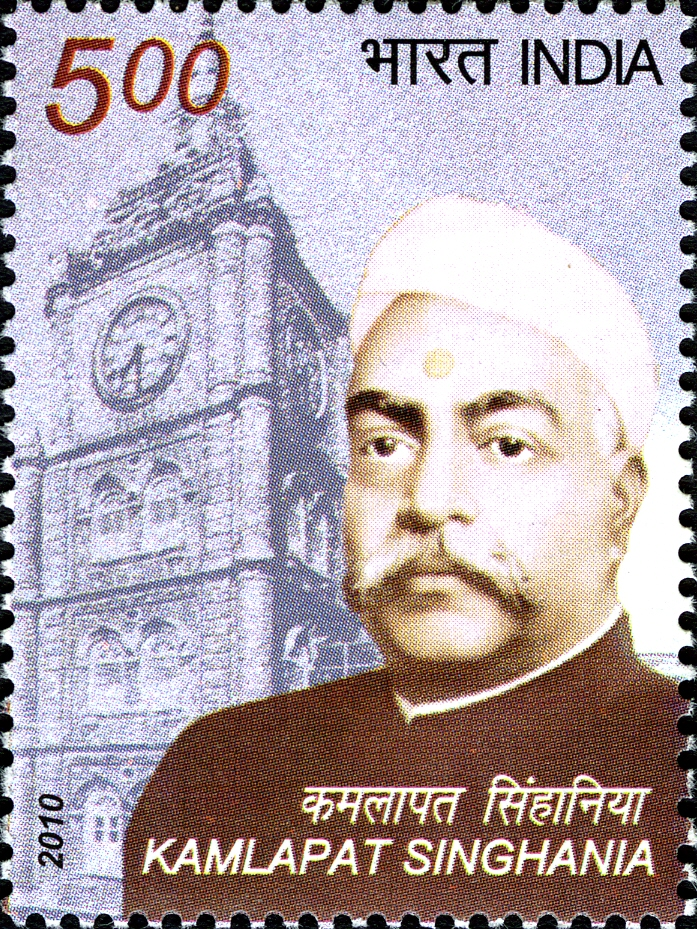
- Born: 7 November 1884; Kanpur, North-Western Provinces, British India
- Died: 31 May 1937 (aged 52); Kanpur, United Provinces, British India
- Occupation: Industrialist
- Known for: J. K. Organisation
- Spouse: Rampyari Singhania
- Children: Padampat Singhania; Kailashpat Singhania; Lakshmipat Singhania
- Parent(s): Juggilal Singhania; Chandribai Singhania
- Relatives: Madan Behari Singhania; Gautam Singhania; Vijaypat Singhania; Gopal Krishna Singhania; Hari Shankar Singhania; Shashvat Singhania
- Family: Singhania family

Lala Kamlapat Singhania (7 November 1884 – 31 May 1937) was an Indian industrialist, who founded the J. K. Organisation, one of India's largest conglomerate companies. He was born to a Marwari Bania family in Kanpur, then part of the North-Western Provinces in British Raj. He was the founder of several companies which came under the umbrella of JK Organization. The first major business set up by him was a cotton mill with the name of Juggilal Kamlapat Cotton Spinning & Weaving Mills in 1921 which laid the foundation for JK Organisation.

== Early life ==
Kamlapat Singhania was born to Juggilal and Chandribai Singhania on 7 November 1884 in Kanpur. He was born into an occupational community of merchants, bankers, money-lenders, traders and dealers. His father was a successful businessman and belonged to the Singhania family of Singhana.

He joined the family business and assisted his father in expanding the business from traditional money-lending operations to trading in areas such as cotton, pulses and sugar cane.

== Business career ==
Kamlapat decided to start a cotton mill as opposed to being selling agents for established mills, as the Singhanias had been until then. Kamlapat secured a loan with the aim of setting up a cotton mill. Along with his father's contribution he established Juggilal Kamlapat Cotton Spinning & Weaving Mills in 1921. JK Cotton Spinning & Weaving Mills produced cotton cloth and yarn and was a successful venture.

He went on to set up several mills – Kamla Ice Factory in 1921, JK Oil Mills in 1924, JK Hosiery Factory in 1929, JK Jute Mills in 1931, MP Sugar Mills in 1932, JK Cotton Manufacturers Ltd in 1933 and JK Iron & Steel Co Ltd in 1934. Kamlapat constructed a new building - Kamla Tower - across street from the family's Kanpur residence in 1934. Kamla Tower became the headquarters of Kamlapat's expanding organization and housed the offices for various companies he founded. The building was inspired by the design features of Big Ben. It is still operational and serves as the headquarters of JK Cement.

== Later life and death ==
In 1935, Kamlapat and his family moved from Kanpur residence to a newly constructed 20-acre bungalow near the Ganges called Ganga Kutir (Ganga Cottage). He also purchased a second property from an Englishman, which was named Kamla Retreat. Kamlapat died in 1937 and was survived by his sons – Padampat, Kailashpat and Lakshmipat.

== Family history ==
As per records of JK Temple Kanpur, Vinodi Das Singhania left his home in Singhana – a little town in the Jhunjhunu district of Rajasthan – in 1775. He resettled in Farrukhabad, a small business town near Kanpur. He started off as a Banker and diversified into trading. This was the time when East India Company was entering India. His sons – Ramsukhdas and Sarbsukhdas – later joined the family business and opened branch offices in Kanpur, Kolkata, Varanasi and Mirzapur.

After Ramsukhdas and Sarbsukhdas, the business was passed on to Ramsukhdas' son, Sewaram. Baldeodas took over the reins of the business along with his brother Munnalal from his father Sewaram. During this time the family also earned the royal title of 'Rajah Sahib'. Baldeodas had six sons and among them was Juggilal who took over the family business and played an important role in expanding and diversifying the business from bankers and traders to industrialists. In 1905, Juggilal and his family shifted to their Kanpur house after a division in the family business which then owned two flour mills — the Ganges Flour Mill and Cawnpore Flour Mill — apart from being the sole selling agents for Elgin Mills, Cawnpore Cotton Mills and Victoria Mills. The division created two new business units – Baldeodas-Kedarnath and Baijnath-Juggilal.

== Personal life ==
Kamlapat married Rampyari Devi and they had three daughters and three sons: Padampat, Kailashpat and Lakshmipat Singhania.

== Legacy ==
JK Organisation founded by Kamlapat is one of the largest conglomerates in India today, with multiple million and billion dollar companies under its belt. Several of these companies are listed publicly and have market capitalization in upwards of billion dollars. Some of the publicly listed companies are JK Tyre, JK Cement, JK Lakshmi Cement, JK Paper, Jaykay Enterprises, JK Sugar, JK Agri Genetics (JK Seeds) and JK Dairy (Umang Dairies). Privately held companies of the group are Raymond Group, J.K. Ansell, JK Technosoft, JK Fenner, Global Strategic Technologies and Dwarkesh Energy.

Kamlapat founded the Merchants' Chamber of Uttar Pradesh in 1932. Kamla Nagar in Kanpur — a township for JK employees – is named after Kamlapat Singhania. A number of institutions founded by members of Singhania family bears his name. Some of them are LK Singhania Education Centre at Gotan, JK Lakshmipat University, JK Institute of Radiology and Cancer Research at Kanpur, Lala Kamlapat Memorial Hospital at Kanpur, J.K. Institute of Applied Physics and Technology (University of Allahabad) and JK Institute of Sociology and Human Relations (University of Lucknow). A commemorative stamp was issued in 2010 by the Indian government honoring Lala Kamlapat Singhania.
