= Singhania family =

Indian business family

- Current region: Kanpur, Delhi, Mumbai, India
- Origin: Singhana, Rajasthan, India
- Members: Lala Juggilal Singhania; Lala Madan Behari Singhania; Lala Kamlapat Singhania; Sir Padampat Singhania; Kailashpat Singhania; Lakshmipat Singhania; Gopal Krishna Singhania; Gaur Hari Singhania; Govind Hari Singhania; Shyam Hari Singhania; Shashvat Singhania; Vijaypat Singhania; Ajaypat Singhania; Hari Shankar Singhania; Bharat Hari Singhania; Raghupati Singhania; Sripati Singhania; Vinita Singhania; Yadupati Singhania; Nidhipati Singhania; Ramapati Singhania; Gautam Singhania; Madhupati Singhania; Akshaypat Singhania; Abhishek Singhania; Anantpat Singhania; Harshpati Singhania; Vikrampati Singhania; Anshuman Singhania; Shrivats Singhania; Dr.Raghavpat Singhania; Madhavkrishna Singhania
- Estates: Kamla Retreat (Kanpur); Ganga Kutir (Kanpur); JK House (Mumbai)

The Singhania family is a prominent Indian business family, that started out in the Indian city of Kanpur. The family expanded into three major branches and is currently based out of Kanpur, Mumbai and Delhi. JK Organisation founded by Lala Kamlapat Singhania is one of the largest conglomerates in India today, with multiple million and billion dollar companies under its belt. The family owns majority stakes in several publicly listed companies such as JK Tyre, JK Cement, JK Lakshmi Cement, JK Paper, Jaykay Enterprises, JK Agri Genetics (JK Seeds) and JK Dairy (Umang Dairies). Some privately held companies in the family are Raymond Group, J.K. Ansell, JK Tech, JK Fenner, JK Insurance brokers and Global Strategic Technologies.

== Family history ==
As per records of JK Temple Kanpur, Vinodi Das Singhania left his home in Singhana - a little town in the Jhunjhunu district of Rajasthan - in 1775. He resettled in Farrukhabad, a small business town near Kanpur. He started off as a Banker and diversified into trading. This was the time when East India Company was entering India. His sons - Ramsukhdas and Sarbsukhdas - later joined the family business and opened branch offices in Kanpur, Kolkata, Varanasi and Mirzapur.

After Ramsukhdas and Sarbsukhdas, the business was passed on to Ramsukhdas' son, Sewaram. Baldeodas took over the reins of the business along with his brother Munnalal from his father Sewaram. During this time the family also earned the royal title of 'Rajah Sahib' . Baldeodas had six sons and among them was Juggilal who took over the family business and played an important role in expanding and diversifying the business from bankers and traders to industrialists. In 1905, Juggilal and his family shifted to their Kanpur house after a division in the family business which then owned two flour mills — the Ganges Flour Mill and Cawnpore Flour Mill — apart from being the sole selling agents for Elgin Mills, Cawnpore Cotton Mills and Victoria Mills. The division created two new business units - Baldeodas-Kedarnath and Baijnath-Juggilal. Baijnath-Juggilal was controlled and managed by Juggilal and his elder son.

After Kamlapat the business was passed on to his three sons - Padampat, Kailashpat and Lakshmipat. Padampat established Straw Products Ltd in 1940 with support from Nawab of Bhopal - Hamidullah Khan. The brothers set up a gas plant - JK Rampur Gas Plant - with support from princely state of Rampur. They also acquired a plant of the Aluminium Corporation of India in Asansol. Lakshmipat took the lead in order to make the plant operational. He also established a small steel plant - JK Steels - near Rishra in West Bengal, and a paper mill in Odisha. The brothers also acquired National Insurance Company during the period of World War II. The family supported the British Government during the war years and stepped up the production to meet the needs of British Army. Due to the support given to British Government during the war years, Padampat Singhania was conferred with knighthood at The Viceroy's House, New Delhi, on 23 February 1943.

In 1944, the family bought a woolen textile mill - Raymond Woollen Mills - in Thane from E.D. Sassoon & Co. Kailashpat took charge of the company and was instrumental in its growth. Today Raymond Group is a leading producer of fabrics in India. The business subsequently got divided between the brothers. Padampat took over the north Zone with Kanpur as headquarters. Lakshmipat resettled in Kolkata and took control of eastern zone while Kailashpat moved to Mumbai to head the western zone. Later on Lakshmipat moved to Delhi and established it as headquarters for businesses under his control.

== Family branches ==
=== Kanpur branch ===
Padampat Singhania continued to manage the businesses from Kanpur while his younger brothers moved to Mumbai and Kolkata. Singhania became the president of the group but the companies operated independently with some cross holdings among them. After Padampat, his eldest son, Gopal Krishna Singhania became president of the company. He was the youngest Chairman of Raymond Woollen Mills Ltd. During the short span of lifetime, he led Raymond to be the top brand and placed Raymond at the head of all exporting woollen mills in India. He established joint ventures with Australia to manufacture indigenous merino wools and expanded business to Kenya. Gopal Krishna had two sons and two daughters namely, Nidhipati Singhania, Gopika Singhania, Ambika Kothari and Ramapati Singhania. After his untimely death his son Ramapati Singhania joined the Singhania family's JK Group of companies in 1980. Later he became an UAE expatriate and founded Varal Consultancy, DMCC, Dubai. now known as HabotConnect, DMCC. Gopal Krishna Singhania’s brother, Gaur Hari Singhania became head of the businesses which were under Kanpur branch of the family. Padampat's younger son Govind Hari Singhania was also involved in the business. After Gaur Hari Singhania's death the business was headed by his son Yadupati Singhania who groomed his nephews Dr.Raghavpat and Madhavkrishna. On 13 August 2020 Yadupati Singhania died in Singapore after a brief illness. Today Raghavpat and Madhavkrishna are managing director and joint managing director of JK Cement respectively.

Companies under the control of Dr.Nidhipati, Dr.Raghavpat & Madhavkrishna are:

- JK Cement Ltd - The company is one of the largest grey cement producers in India & the third largest manufacturer of white cement in the world, it is also the largest wall putty manufacturer in the world.
- JK Maxx Paints Ltd - The company has acquired a decorative paints company "Acro Paints Ltd" in 2023. This makes JK Maxx Paints a substantial player in the Indian decorative paints market.
- Yadu International - The company is a holding company off the family assets.
- Arr Emm Holdings Pvt Ltd - The company is involved in handloom revival and export of handloom articles.

Companies under the control of Abhishek, Son of Govind Hari Singhania, are:

- JK Technosoft - The company is involved in software supply.
- Jaykay Enterprises Ltd (formerly JK Synthetics Ltd.) - The company was involved in manufacturing of nylon and acrylic fibres,
- JK Cotton Ltd - The company was incorporated as a private company on 24 October 1924, originally founded by Kamlapat Singhania. The cotton mill closed in 1989 due to union issues and overall decline of industry in Kanpur.

=== Mumbai branch ===
The family purchased a textile mill - Raymond Woolen Mills - from ED Sassoon & Co in 1944. Kailashpat Singhania took over the control of the business and moved to Mumbai. After Kailashpat, Gopal Krishna his nephew, took over the business and on his death Vijaypat managed the company. Currently it is being controlled and managed by Vijaypat's eldest son - Gautam Singhania. Companies and brands under control of Mumbai branch of the family are:

- Raymond Group - Indian branded fabric and fashion retailer.
- Raymond Apparel Ltd - A subsidiary of Raymond group. Brands under Raymond Apparel are Park Avenue, Parx, Ethnix, and ColorPlus.
- JK Files India Limited - Subsidiary of Raymond group and the largest producer of files in the world.
- JK Ansell - Manufacturers and marketers of KamaSutra condoms. Also a subsidiary of Raymond group India.

=== Delhi branch ===
In 1942, Kamlapat's youngest son Lakshmipat led the effort for acquisition of Aluminium Corporation of India plant in Asansol. He also established a small steel plant - JK Steels in West Bengal - and a paper mill in Odisha. In 1960s, due to labor union problems in West Bengal and nationalisation of several companies under family's control, the family moved from Kolkata to Delhi. After Lakshmipat, his eldest son Hari Shankar Singhania took over the control of the companies and managed it along with his brothers and other family members. Major companies under control of Delhi branch of the family are:

- JK Tyre - Engaged in manufacturing and marketing of tires and a market leader in radial tires in India. It has a worldwide customer base in over 80 countries across all 6 continents.
- JK Paper Ltd - Engaged in manufacturing and marketing of paper products.
- JK Lakshmi Cement - Manufacturer of cement and cementitious materials.
- JK Fenner - The company is engaged in manufacturing of products such as belts, pulleys, couplings, variable speed drives, clutches and gear boxes.
- Other Companies - The other companies of the Delhi JK Group are JK Seeds, Umanng Dairy, Global Strategic Technologies (Defence Tech), CliniRx - a clinical research firm, JK Risk Managers (Insurance) and Indica Travels. The Group also runs a superspeciality hospital PSRI, in the National capital which is a world class hospital for heart, liver, renal and gastro diseases apart from other well-equipped divisions which cater to national and international patients across the Globe. The Delhi Group also runs JK Lakshmipat University near Jaipur which offers curriculum in engineering, business management and design streams.

== Prominent members ==
- Lala Juggilal Singhania (1857-1922) - Born to Baldeodas in 1857. He was the founder of JK Organisation along with his son Lala Kamlapat Singhania.
  - Lala Kamlapat Singhania (1884-1937) - He was the younger of two sons of Juggilal and founder of JK Organisation
    - Kailashpat Singhania (1907-1969) - Second son of Kamlapat Singhania, headed the western zone of business from Mumbai. Instrumental in growth of Raymond Group.
      - Vijaypat Singhania (born 1938) - Son of Kailashpat Singhania and former Chairman and Managing Director of Raymond Ltd, India. Currently Chairman Emeritus of Raymond Ltd.
        - Gautam Singhania (born 1965) - Son of Vijaypat Singhania and current Chairman and Managing Director of Raymond Group since 1999.
      - Anant Singhania, son of Ajaypat Singhania (Brother of Vijaypat Singhania) is the CEO of JK Enterprises, Director of Platinum Fashion Apparel Limited, Past President of Bombay Management Association, Vice President of IMC Chamber of Commerce and Co Chair of FICCI, Maharashtra State Council.
    - Padampat Singhania (1904–1979) - Eldest son of Lala Kamlapat Singhania, he continued to manage the companies from Kanpur. He was conferred with knighthood by the British in 1943. He was also the President of JK Organisation until his death.
      - Gopal Krishna Singhania (1933-1980) - Eldest son of Padampat Singhania and former Chairman Raymonds, JK Synthetics and Vice President of JK Organization.
        - Ramapati Singhania (born 1956)- Son of Gopal Krishna Singhania. He is the founder and Managing Director of Varal Consultancy, DMCC, Dubai.
      - Gaur Hari Singhania (1935-2015) - Son of Padampat Singhania and former Chairman of JK Group Kanpur.
        - Yadupati Singhania (1953-2020) - Son of Gaur Hari Singhania was the Chairman and Managing Director of JK Cement Ltd. He was an alumnus of IIT Kanpur.
      - Govind Hari Singhania (1937-2014) - Son of Padampat Singhania and Director of JK Organisation.
    - Lakshmipat Singhania (1910-1976) - Youngest son of Kamlapat Singhania, he headed the northern zone of JK Organisation's businesses. He moved to Kolkata from Kanpur and later on established Delhi as headquarters for businesses under his control. His family controls companies such as JK Paper, JK Laskhmi Cement and JK Tyre.
      - Hari Shankar Singhania (1933-2013) - Son of Lakshmipat Singhania and former Chairman of JK Paper, JK Tyre and JK Lakshmi Cement. He was also on board of several companies and held positions of Director and President for various companies. He was also the President of JK Organisation until his death. He was awarded Padma Bhushan - the third-highest civilian award in the Republic of India - in the year 2003. He was also awarded Royal Order of Polar Star from the King of Sweden.
      - Bharat Hari Singhania (born 1939) - Son of Lakshmipat Singhania and current President of JK Organisation. He is also the current Chairman & MD of JK Lakshmi Cement, MD & Executive Director of JK Tyre and Chairman of JK Paper and JK Agri Genetics Ltd.
        - Harsh Pati Singhania (born 1961) - Son of Bharat Hari Singhania. He is the current Chairman & MD of JK Paper Limited.
        - Vikrampati Singhania (born 1967) - Son of Bharat Hari Singhania. He is the Managing Director of JK Fenner (India) Ltd and former Managing Director of JK Tyre from 1997 to 2016. He is also the Managing Director of JK Agri Genetics Limited.
      - Raghupati Singhania (born 1947) - Son of Lakshmipat Singhania. He is the current Chairman & MD of JK Tyre & Industries Limited. He also holds position of Director and Chairman in several other organisations.
      - Vinita Singhania (born 1953) - Wife of Sri Pati Singhania and daughter in law of Lakshmipat Singhania. She is the current Vice-Chairperson & Managing Director of JK Lakshmi Cement.
        - Anshuman Singhania - Son of Sri Pati and Vinita Singhania. He is the Deputy Managing Director of JK Tyre & Industries.
        - Shrivats Singhania - He is the younger son of Sri Pati Singhania and Vinita Singhania and is currently the Director of Udaipur Cement Works Limited.
