= Raymond Ltd =

Indian fabric manufacturer

- Company type: Public company
- Traded as: BSE: 500330 NSE: RAYMOND
- Industry: Textiles
- Founded: 1925; 101 years ago
- Founder: Albert Raymond; Abraham Jacob Raymond
- Headquarters: Mumbai, Maharashtra, India
- Key people: Gautam Singhania, Chairman & Managing Director; Amit Aggarwal, Chief Financial Officer
- Parent: Raymond Group
- Website: raymond.in

Raymond Ltd is an integrated fabric manufacturer. It a part of the Raymond Group that is headquartered in Mumbai, India.

== Overview ==
As of 2011, the company reported a distribution network of more than 4,000 branded outlets and 637 exclusive retail stores, with products available through about 30,000 retailers in over 150 Indian cities.

== History ==
Raymond Ltd. was incorporated as Raymond Woollen Mill in 1925 by Albert Raymond and Abraham Jacob Raymond near Thane Creek. Lala Kailashpat Singhania took over Raymond Woollen Mill in 1944. In 1958, the company opened its Retail showroom King's Corner at Ballard Estate, Mumbai. Raymond established a garment plant in Thane in 1968, followed by a manufacturing facility in Jalgaon, Maharashtra, in 1979.

In 2000, Vijaypat Singhania transferred control of the company to his younger son, Gautam Singhania, and in 2015, 37.57% shares were transferred to him.

In November 2015, the company appointed Sanjay Behl as CEO and M Shivkumar as CFO.
