= List of educational institutions in Prayagraj =

Prayagraj is a city in the state of Uttar Pradesh, India.

== Universities and colleges of Prayagraj ==
=== Universities ===
==== Central University ====
- University of Allahabad

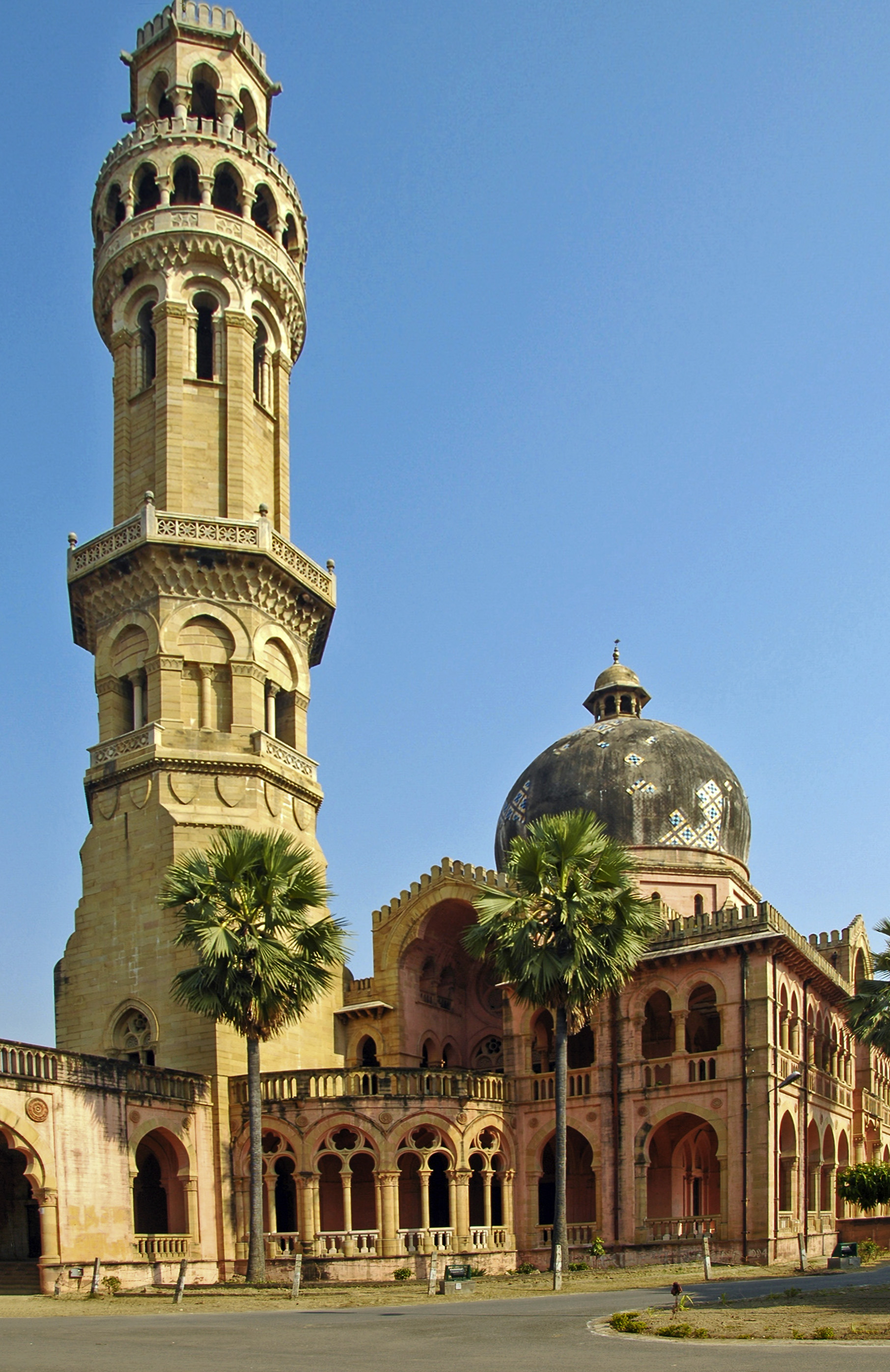
Muir Tower of Allahabad University

==== Institutes of National Importance ====
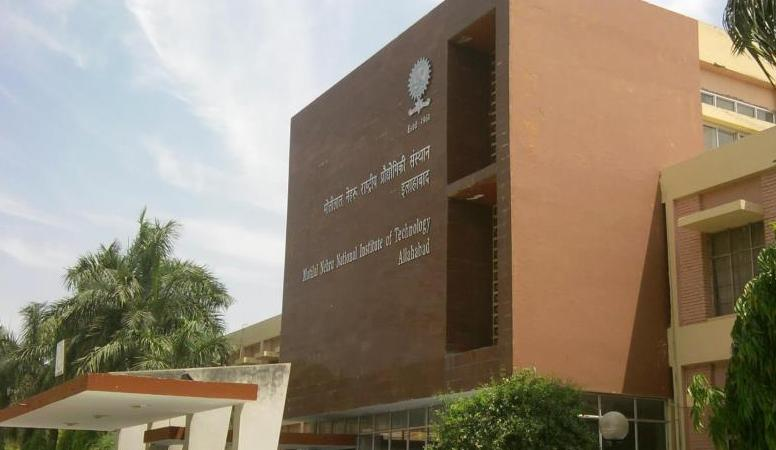
Academic Block of MNNIT

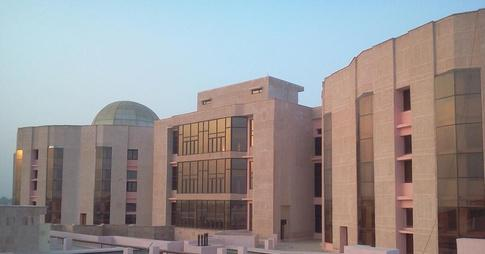
Computer Centre of IIIT-A

- Indian Institute of Information Technology Allahabad
- Motilal Nehru National Institute of Technology

==== Deemed Universities ====
- Nehru Gram Bharati University, Prayagraj

==== State Universities ====
Bioengineering school of SHUATS

- Allahabad State University, Prayagraj
- Sam Higginbottom University of Agriculture, Technology and Sciences
- Dr. Rajendra Prasad National Law University

=== Autonomous college ===
- Ewing Christian College

=== Degree college ===
- Shiv Ganga Degree College

=== Research institutes ===
- Botanical Survey of India (Central Regional Centre), Prayagraj
- Centre for Social Forestry and Eco-Rehabilitation (a centre of ICFRE)
- Govind Ballabh Pant Social Science Institute
- Harish Chandra Research Institute
- Indian Institute of Geomagnetism (Regional Center)
- National Academy of Sciences, India

=== Medical institutes and colleges ===
- Kamla Nehru Memorial Hospital
- Motilal Nehru Medical College

=== Campuses of other universities ===
- Birla Institute of Technology, Mesra (BIT Mesra, Prayagraj Campus)- closed
- Mahatma Gandhi Antarrashtriya Hindi Vishwavidyalaya (Wardha, Prayagraj campus)
- Rashtriya Sanskrit Sansthan (Ganganath Jha Prayagraj Campus)

=== Engineering and other colleges ===
- Institute of Engineering and Rural Technology, Prayagraj
- Devprayag Institute of Technical Studies
- HMFA Memorial Institute of Engineering and Technology
- J.K. Institute of Applied Physics and Technology
- SP Memorial Institute of Technology

== Schools ==
- Boys' High School and College
- Delhi Public School
- Holy Trinity School
- Girls' High School, Prayagraj
- Jawahar Navodaya Vidyalaya, Mejakhas, Prayagraj
- Laurels International School
- Shiv Ganga Vidya Mandir, Phaphamau, Allahabad
- St. Joseph's College
- St. Mary's Convent Inter College
- St. Anthony's Convent Girls' Inter College, Prayagraj
