= Economy of Thiruvananthapuram =

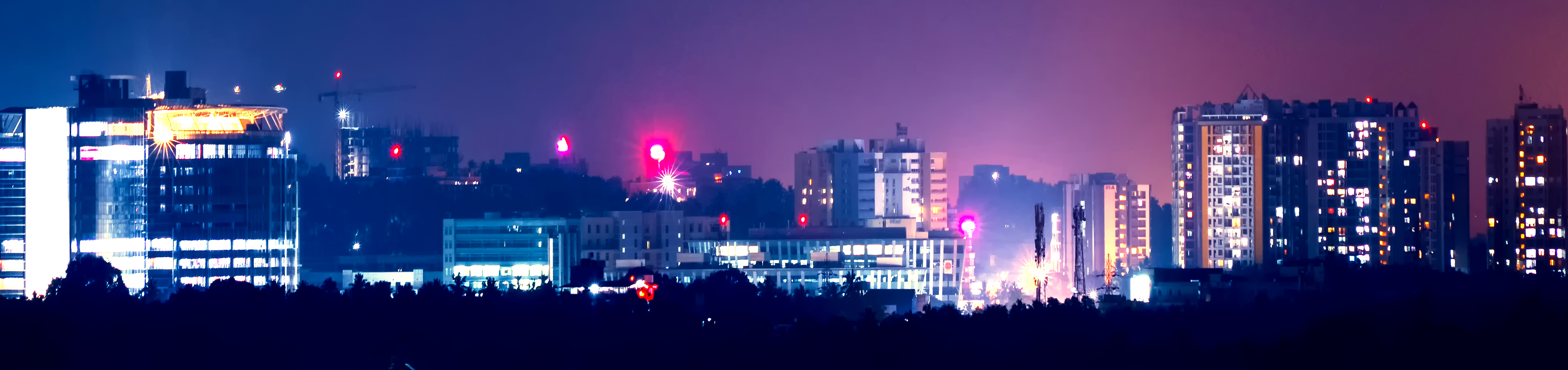
Thiruvananthapuram Techno-valley

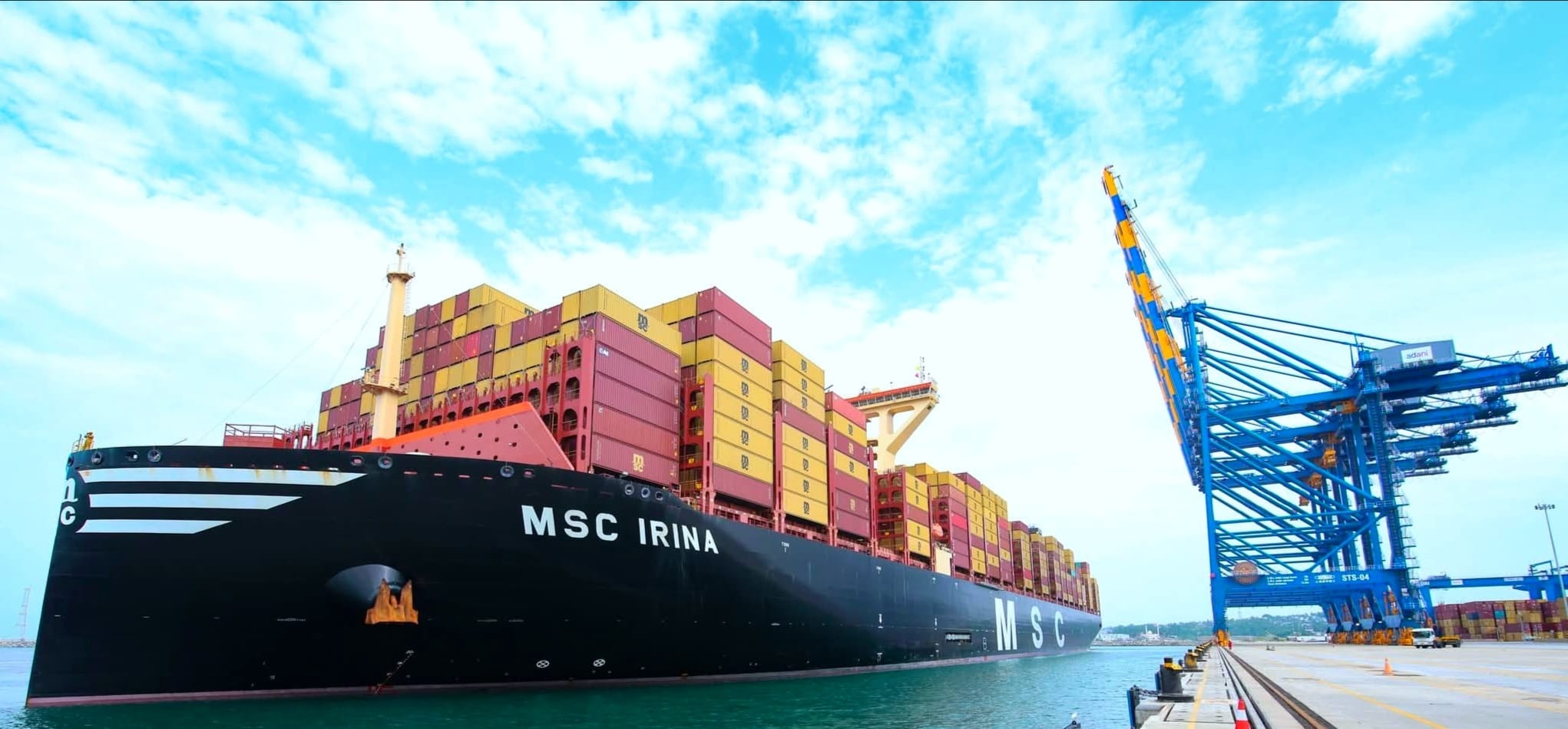
MSC Irinia World's Largest Container Ship Arriving For First Time in India And South Asia In Thiruvananthapuram

The economy of Thiruvananthapuram, capital of the Indian state of Kerala, mostly consists of tourism and leisure, information technology, rubber plantations, coffee production, tea production, and education. There are many manufacturers, such as Travancore Titanium Products Ltd and English Indian Clays (The Thaper Group).

== Manufacturing industries ==
In Thiruvananthapuram there are many medium and large scale industries which fall under central sector, state sector, co-operative sector, joint sector and private sectors. The Kerala State Industrial Development Corporation is a public sector establishment to set up small scale and large scale industries effectively. The registered working factories in the city include oil mills, cashew factories, cotton textiles, saw mills, printing units, rubber industrial units, chemical units, match factories, general engineering units and automobile workshops. The S.M.S.M. Institute in Thiruvananthapuram is a major institution through which the products of the handicraft industries are marketed.

There is an industrial estate at Pappanamcode and an industrial development centre at Kochuveli. Traditional industries such as coir and handloom are now faced with several problems. Handloom weaving is prevalent at Balaramapuram, Amaravila, Kulathoor, and Chirayinkeezhu, which are located in the suburbs of the city. It is estimated that clothes worth ₹9.50 crores are annually produced in the handloom sector. Keltron (Kerala State Electronics Development Corporation) has made inroads into electronic markets throughout the country. The Kerala State Sericulture Co-operative Federation Limited had declared Balaramapuram a "silk village" in 2004 and the silk yarn produced at different centres in Kerala is processed to fabric at Balaramapuram.

Companies such as Travancore Titanium Products Ltd, the leading manufacturer of anatase grade titanium dioxide in Asia, English Indian Clays Limited, Kerala Automobiles Ltd, the leading public sector company in manufacturing three-wheelers in south India are located in the city. Hindustan Latex Limited is an Indian giant in the manufacturing of latex-based products, including condoms. They currently hold a license to manufacture Ormeloxifene, a form of birth control. HLL is headquartered in the city. BrahMos Aerospace Private Limited, the manufacturer of cruise missiles has the manufacturing unit in the city.

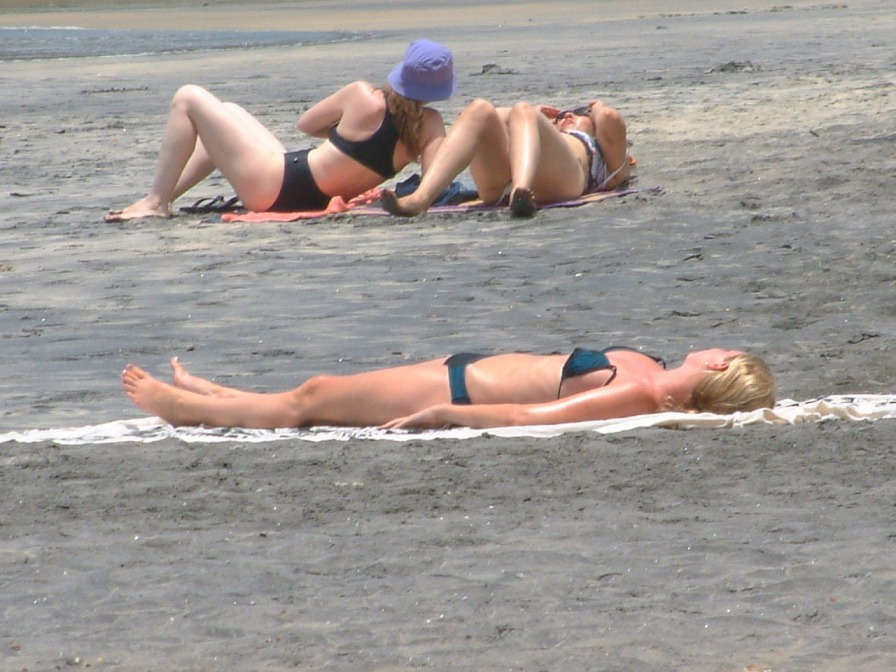
Foreign Tourists in the international beach of Kovalam

== Tourism ==
Tourism has also contributed heavily to the economy of Thiruvananthapuram. Thiruvananthapuram, is a destination for chartered flights to India for Medical tourism. Padmanabha Swamy temple located in Thiruvananthapuram is considered as the richest temple in the world and has got 3 Trillion USD worth treasure.

== Information technology ==
Professionals at work in the Technopark campus

Technopark was established for the development of electronics and information technology in the State. It is India's first industrial park dedicated to electronics, software, and IT ventures. Started 1995, the campus at Thiruvananthapuram city covers an area the 330 acres (1,335,462.6 m^{2}) campus with 4,000,000 sq ft (370,000 m^{2}). of built-up space available currently and another 2,000,000 more sq ft of built up space coming up, is now home to over 260 companies. Over 35,000 IT professionals are working here. The companies include one CMMI level 5 and PCMM level 5 company, four CMM Level 5, two CMM Level 3 and several ISO 9001 certified companies. Technopark is undergoing major expansion with the development of the Technocity project.

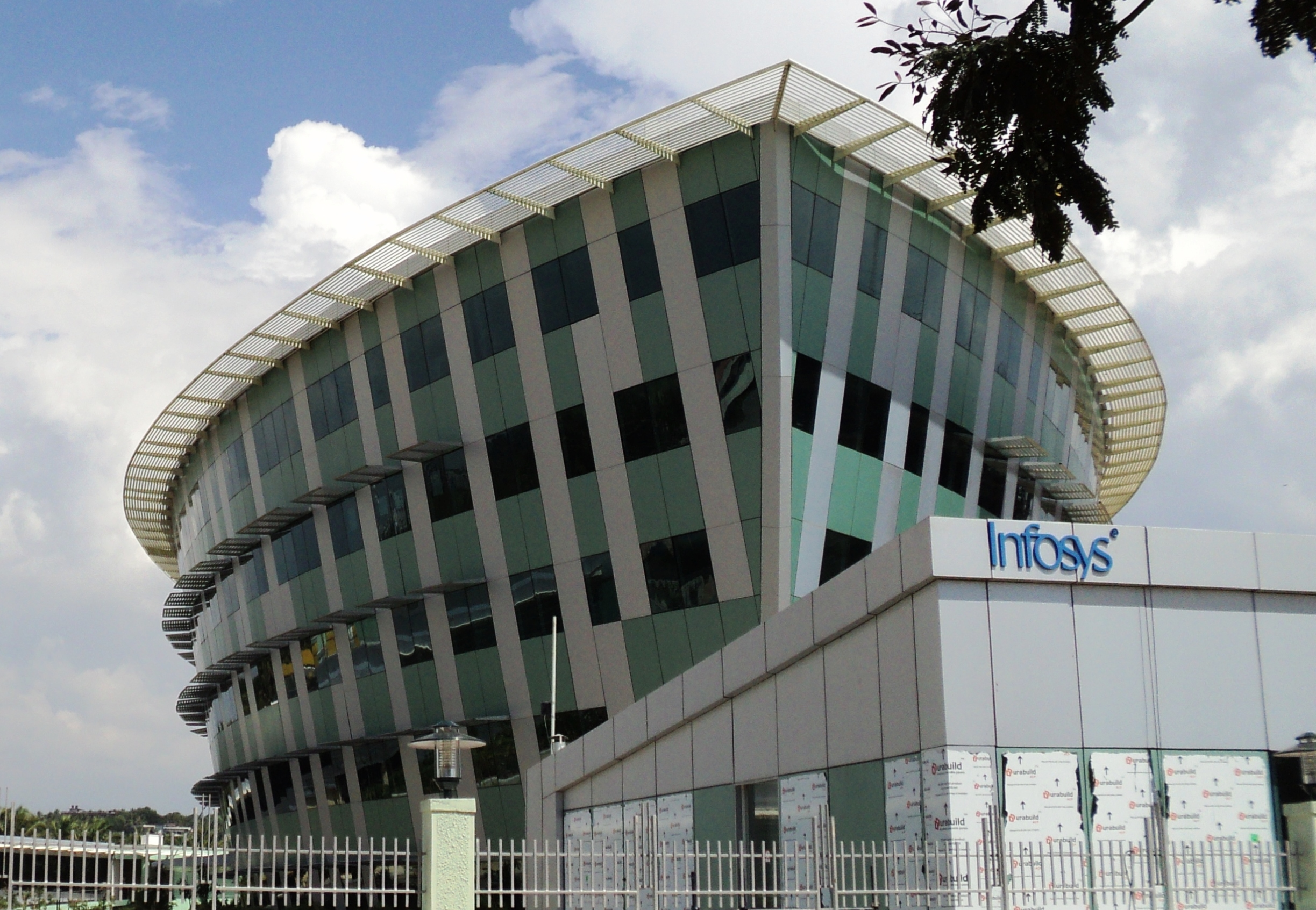
A building at the Infosys-Thiruvananthapuram campus

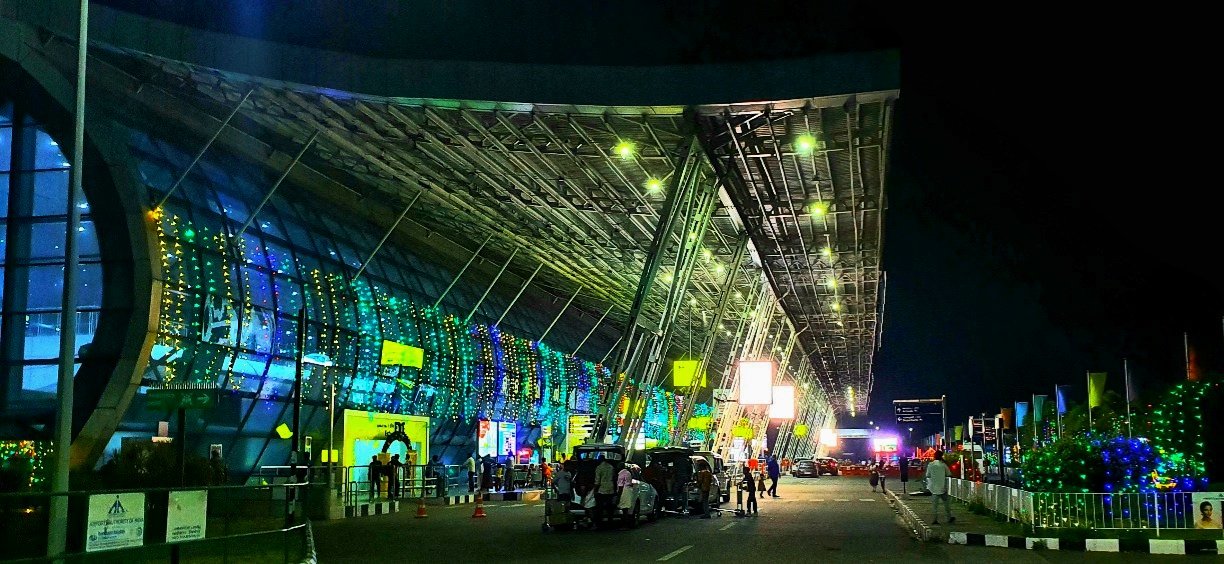
Thiruvananthapuram International Airport

Thiruvananthapuram was rated as the best 2nd tier metro with IT/ITES infrastructure, and second in terms of availability of human talent . The district contributes 80% of software exports from the state. Technopark also houses global majors like Oracle Corporation, Infosys, TCS, HCL, Visual Graphics Computing Services, Ernst & Young Global Shared Services Center, Allianz Technology, UST Global, Tata Elxsi, IBS Software Services, NeST Software, SunTec Business Solutions etc.

== Aerospace ==
The Indian Space Programme came into being on 21 November 1963 with the launching of a sounding rocket from Thumba in Thiruvananthapuram city borders. This Thumba Equatorial Rocket Launching Station (TERLS) ultimately blossomed into various centres of the Indian Space Research Organisation (ISRO). Vikram Sarabhai Space Centre (VSSC) is the prime centre engaged in design and development of launch vehicles.

The ISRO under the Department of Space, Government of India has the VSSC at Thumba and Liquid Propulsion Systems Centre (LPSC) at Valiyamala Nedumangadu in Thiruvananthapuram district. The ISRO Inertial System Unit (IISU) of the ISRO and the Reinforced Plastic Centre (REPLACE) function from Vattiyoorkavu in the city.

== Biotechnology ==
Since the commencement of Rajiv Gandhi Centre for Biotechnology (RGCB) in 2002, the domain of biotechnology is a rapidly expanding field in the city. The Biotechnology park owned by KINFRA in Kazhakkoottam is home to many biotechnology companies. The establishments such as Regional Cancer Centre, CSIR - Regional Research Laboratory (RRL), Sree Chitra Thirunal Institute of Medical Sciences and Technology (SCTIMST) contributes much to the biotechnology, microbiology related industries.
