= Poonam Soni =

Indian jewelry designer

- Born: Delhi, India
- Occupations: Founder and Principal Designer at Poonam Soni Signature Line Pvt Ltd

Poonam Soni is an Indian jewellery designer based in Mumbai.

== Early life ==
The eldest among three children of an officer in the Indian army, she lived in Delhi with her grandparents and was educated there. Soni graduated from Delhi University as a gold medalist. She married at the age of 18 and shifted to Mumbai where she started her career in jewelry after the birth of her two daughters – Kriti and Esha.

== Career ==
=== 1990s ===
Soni has been making designer and bespoke jewelry since 1989. Her first boutique was opened by Juhi Chawla in 1992; the same year she turned down an offer to produce jewelry for Harrods.

Soni has since showcased her jewelry for Louis Vuitton Moet Hennessy in Paris as well as for Prince Albert II of Monte Carlo. Her craftwork has been praised by Michael Kors.

=== 2000s ===
In 2006, the LVMH Moet Hennessy group invited Soni to showcase at the opening of the Incredible India show in Paris. In 2009, her 'Monochromes' collection was listed as a Global Trend 2009 in the Italian Forecast book. They were also successfully auctioned in Delhi.

=== 2010s ===
In 2010 she designed a piece of jewelry called Itai Doshin in an exclusive auction by Eco Art, which was supported by Prince Albert II of Monaco.

In 2011 Poonam Soni was invited by Eco Art supported by Prince Albert II to take part in a global parade with 32 select designers worldwide. The falcon brooch created by Soni was sold in an auction at Abu Dhabi by Lord Mark Poltimore of Sotheby's during the Grand Prix Finale under the patronage of Sheikh Nahayan Mabarak Al-Nahayan.

Platinum Guild approached Poonam Soni in 2010 to change the face of Platinum jewelry in India.

Soni collaborated Terry Fox Foundation, and hosted a fashion show in February 2015 where she displayed her jewelry and auctioned some of her pieces to raise money for Tata Memorial Hospital's cancer treatment ward.

Soni was featured in the Book of Collectors of Fine Jewelry in 2017, along with masters like Cartier, Bulgari, Chopard Rosenthal etc.

Soni has collaborated with Gautam Singhania's wife Nawaz Modi Singhania in 2016 to create a branded collection of jewelry with art. The jewelry incorporates colorful miniature paintings in bold cuffs and sautoirs. She also collaborated with artist Laxman Shresta in 2014.
