= Vijaypat Singhania =

Indian businessman (1938–2026)

Honorary Air Commodore Vijaypat Singhania
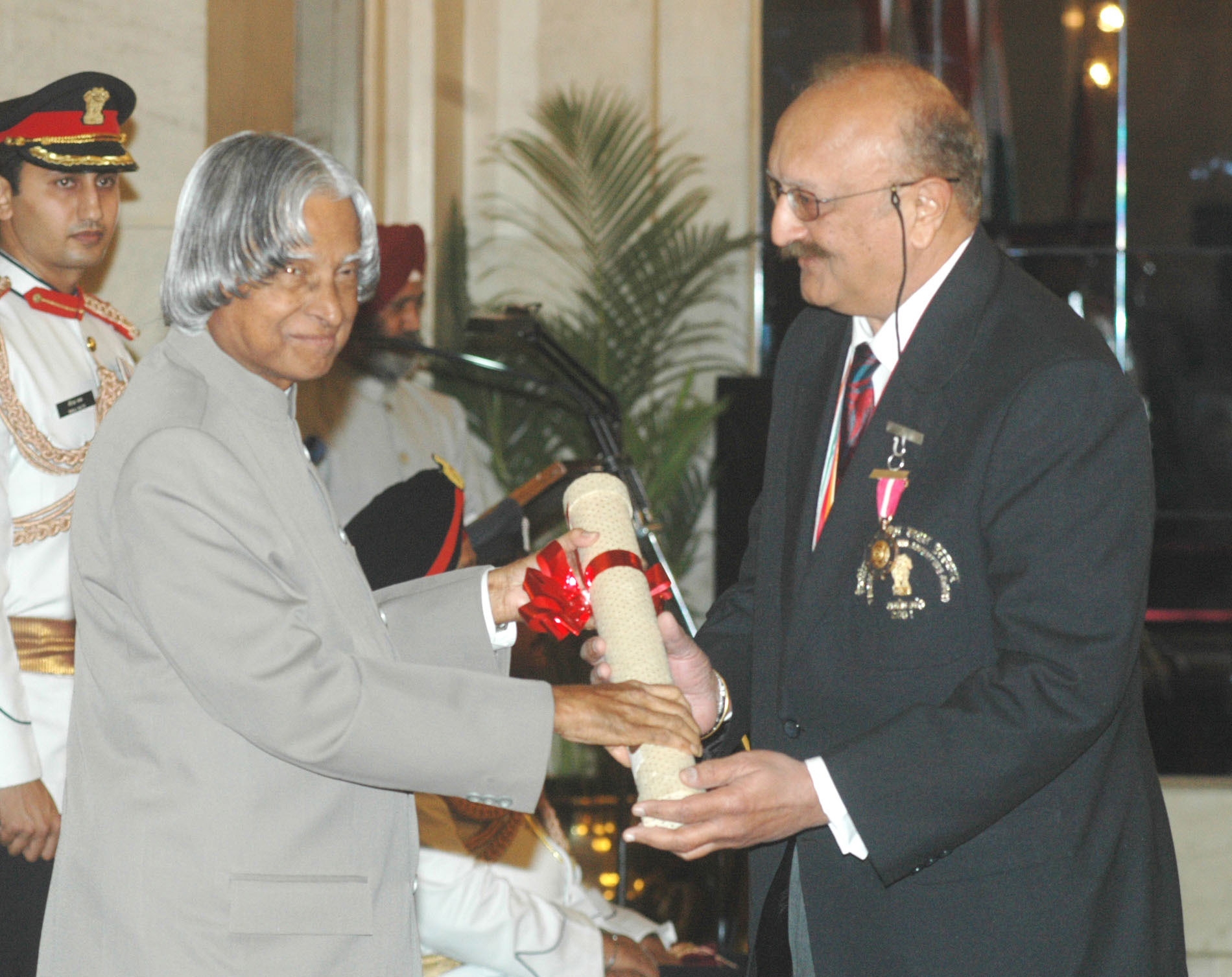
- Singhania (right) receiving the Padma Bhushan from A. P. J. Abdul Kalam in 2006

Sheriff of Mumbai
- In office 20 December 2006 – 19 December 2007
- Preceded by: Sadruddin Daya
- Succeeded by: Indu Shahani

Personal details
- Born: 4 October 1938
- Died: 28 March 2026 (aged 87)
- Children: 4, including Gautam
- Occupation: Businessman and aviator
- Known for: • Being Chairman (1980–2000) and Managing Director of Raymond Group • World Record for highest altitude gained travelling in a hot air balloon at the age of 67
- Awards: Tenzing Norgay National Adventure Award (2001); Padma Bhushan (2006)

Vijaypat Lala Kailashpat Singhania (4 October 1938 – 28 March 2026) was an Indian businessman and aviator. A member of the prominent Singhania family, he was well-known as a textile magnate, having been chairman and managing director of the Raymond Group from 1980 to 2000. In flight, he holds the world record for highest altitude gained in a hot air balloon and also set a microlight endurance record in 1988 by flying from London to Delhi in 23 days. He authored a book-length memoir, the story of his microlight flight, and his autobiography.

The Government of India gave him two awards, the Tenzing Norgay National Adventure Award for his aviation exploits in 2001, and the Padma Bhushan for his achievements overall in 2006. In addition, the Indian Air Force made him an Honorary Air Commodore in 1994. Mumbai named him the 2006 Sheriff of Mumbai.

In 2015, he gave his entire 37% stake in Raymond Group to his younger son and then-chairman of Raymond Gautam Singhania. This was the start of a widely-publicized and long-running feud in Singhania's family over various matters stemming from the transfer.

== Business ==
Singhania had said that he only went into business at the behest of his father, Lala Kailashpat (L.K.) Singhania. He did not enjoy the subjects of commerce and economics as a student, and only came to appreciate them later in life when he was teaching postgraduate management classes at the JBIMS. He has mused that he might have been better off becoming a scientist or engineer, since maths and science were his best subjects in school and he tended to get poor marks in everything else.

His father Lala Kailashpat Singhania initially ran Raymond after the Singhania family purchased it from E.D. Sassoon & Co. in 1944, when it was merely a textile mill. Singhania's cousin Gopal Krishna (G.K.) Singhania took it over after L.K. Singhania's death in 1969. Vijaypat Singhania became chairman in January 1980, after G.K. Singhania's death.

According to Singhania, Hari Shankar Singhania, another of his cousins, was the one who initially wanted to take over Raymond after G.K. Singhania died. However, Singhania claimed that the senior executives threatened to quit at this prospect, saying they would only work for L.K. Singhania's eldest son. That happened to be Singhania, who at the time was running J.K. Chemicals, one of the J.K. Organisation companies. He was initially disinterested in the Raymond chairman position as he was happy at J.K. Chemicals, but said he agreed to take it once he heard of the senior executives' views.

During his time at the helm of Raymond, he led the company into having one of the best-known clothing brands in India, it being one of the most successful of any of the Singhania family companies for much of his tenure. He also expanded it into an industrial conglomerate, taking it from solely a woolen textile manufacturer to also producing synthetic fabrics, denim, steel, files, and cement. This ran the company into trouble late in his chairmainship, however, as a recession affecting steel and cement cut deeply into the company's profits in 1996–97. Raymond put up several of its divisions for sale during this time. In September 2000, Singhania turned the Raymond chairmanship over to his son Gautam Singhania, who completed the sale of the company's synthetics, steel, and cement divisions early in his tenure, opting to retain the rest. Singhania stayed on as Chairman-Emeritus, in a non-executive capacity.

In March 2007 he was nominated to be Chairman of the Governing Council at the IIMA until 2012 (succeeding N.R. Narayana Murthy). He had previously been on the board of the IIMA from 1991 to 2002.

== Aviation ==
Singhania was an enthusiastic aviator; by 2003 he had accumulated over 5000 hours of flying experience. He has cited Howard Hughes and J.R.D. Tata as his idols in aviation.

In 1988, he set a speed-over-time endurance record for microlight aircraft by flying solo from London Biggin Hill Airport in London to Safdarjung Airport in New Delhi over 23 days. The prior record holder Brian Milton and then-Minister-of-State Sheila Dikshit met him on the tarmac in Delhi to give their congratulations. Singhania said the most difficult part of the journey for him was flying between Crete and Alexandria across the Mediterranean Sea; he has a fear of deep water, and flew that leg wearing a life jacket and with a can of shark repellent in his lap. When he got bored in the air, he would pass the time by carrying on pretend conversations with a photo of his two-year-old granddaughter Ananya.

He and his American co-pilot Daniel Brown won the gold medal in an international around-the-world air race held by the Fédération Aéronautique Internationale in 1994, to mark its 50th anniversary. They flew a Cessna Conquest painted to look like a tiger in honor of India; Singhania was the only Indian in the race. They made a flight time of 56 hours and 4 minutes, passing through nine countries in 23 days, leaving from and returning to Montreal. Singhania's older son Madhupati Singhania poured champagne over Singhania's head on the tarmac when he arrived back in Montreal with the win.

Singhania holds the world record for altitude in a hot air balloon as of 2023, about 69,000 ft, which he set in November 2005 at the age of 67. He flew with a balloon as tall as a 22-storey building and equipped with 18 burners, travelling in a pressurized aluminium capsule in place of the traditional basket to ward off high-altitude hypoxia. Liftoff was from a racecourse in Mumbai, accompanied by much fanfare—there was a brass band playing, a crowd of hundreds of spectators to see him off, and international media there to report. Aloft he encountered temperatures as low as -93 °C, "screamed quite loudly" according to him when he broke the record, then returned to the ground near the village of Panchale in Nashik district, in the space of about five hours total. After landing he gave prayers at a local shrine. The Fédération Aéronautique Internationale verified his record using an altimeter, GPS, and barograph which were attached to the capsule and sealed in advance to rule out tampering.

== Family feud ==
In 1998, Singhania was weighing the possibility of dividing the Raymond Group between his two sons, Madhupati Singania and Gautam Singhania, who were both on the board of directors at that time. As of the summer of that year, there was reportedly a tentative plan for Madhupati Singhania to relocate to Singapore with control of Raymond's international divisions, including J.K. England and Raymond Woolen Mills Kenya. However, in December, Madhupati Singhania and his wife Anuradha instead signed an agreement with Singhania relinquishing their stake in Raymond, as well as some other family assets such as real estate holdings. They then moved to Singapore with their four children, including Singhania's granddaughter Ananya, and cut ties acrimoniously with the Singhania family. Reportedly Madhupati Singhania had disagreements with his father about management technique. As of 2007 he had obtained Singaporean citizenship and was running a consulting firm.

In the wake of Madhupati Singhania's split with the family, Singhania instead chose to hand control of the Raymond Group wholly over to Gautam Singhania, staying on as Chairman-Emeritus. Then in February 2015, Madhupati Singhania's four children sued Singhania in the Bombay High Court, claiming the 1998 agreement between their parents and him did not take their rights into account. They wanted to have the agreement annulled and their stake in the relinquished holdings reaffirmed, including in Raymond. Five days after their initial filing, Singhania transferred all of his shares in Raymond, a 37.17% stake worth around ₹1000 crore, to Gautam Singhania. As part of the court proceedings, his grandchildren tried to have the court intervene to stop this transfer, but the judge dismissed their motion. Ultimately they did not prevail in their case.

Trouble soon developed between Singhania and Gautam Singhania, however. Back in 2007, Raymond had decided to renovate its 37-storey property J.K. House in Breach Candy. Singhania was living in a flat there at the time. As part of the development agreement, all the tenants, including Singhania, were promised flats following the renovations at the rate of ₹9000 per sq. ft. Singhania had moved back into his childhood home of Kamla Cottage in Juhu to wait out the renovation.

Later in 2015, though, Gautam Singhania filed a complaint with the Bombay High Court alleging that Singhania was not honoring a 2008 arbitration agreement over possession of Kamla Cottage and had to leave it. Singhania agreed to leave and rented a duplex in Breach Candy. The J.K. House flats were ready the following year. However, the rates on them had increased to over ₹1 lakh per sq. ft, according to sources at Raymond. Considering all the flats in total, they said, the difference was around ₹650 crore. Gautam Singhania decided to consult with the board over whether they should still honor the agreement given the increased rates, and they decided to put it to the shareholders, who overwhelmingly voted against it.

All of this left Singhania deeply upset with Gautaum Singhania. He sued for ownership of the J.K. House flat and reimbursement for rent paid on his duplex after the flat was ready, and publicly accused Gautaum Singhania of aiming to dishonor their agreement by asking the shareholders when Singhania felt the decision should have been kept within the board. Gautaum Singhania told the press in response, "Shareholder interest is paramount and supersedes family interest." Singhania in turn accused Gautam Singhania of actually wanting to keep the floor space Singhania was allotted in the agreement for himself, because Gautam Singhania was living in J.K. House as part of his salary in lieu of claiming health benefits and allegedly had claimed extra floor space there after the agreement was turned down. Gautam Singhania told the press that "vested interests" and "opportunists" were "misleading" Singhania and trying to drive a wedge between the two of them.

In 2017, the judge on Singhania's lawsuit requested that the two of them try to work things out within the family before pursuing the case further, noting that he felt the matter rightfully should not have required court resolution. Gautam Singhania said that he did not want the dispute to affect Raymond's reputation and that he would do whatever he could to resolve it. Singhania said that he was shocked he had needed to sue in the first place after how much he had given Gautam Singhania, and that given his son's "greed" and "arrogance and dishonesty" he doubted they would be able to reconcile even if they settled the case.

== Books ==
Singhania wrote the book An Angel in the Cockpit, an account of his journey from the UK to India on a microlight aircraft in 1988.

In 2021, Pan Macmillan published his autobiography An Incomplete Life. A warm review in The Tribune said that he "[accepts] his follies and foibles," keeping a "mostly reflective" tone, and that his "achievements go beyond the imagination" while "the missteps make him as vulnerable as any ordinary man."

== Death ==
Singhania died on 28 March 2026, at the age of 87.

Preceded by Sadruddin Daya	Sheriff of Mumbai; 20 December 2006 – 19 December 2007	Succeeded by Indu Shahani
