= Moods Condoms =

Indian contraceptive manufacturer

- Current owner: HLL Lifecare Limited
- Country: India (Headquartered in Trivandrum)
- Introduced: 1968; 58 years ago
- Markets: 30 countries
- Website: moodsplanet.com

Moods Condoms is a manufacturer of condoms made from natural rubber latex. It is manufactured by HLL Lifecare Limited, Trivandrum, an undertaking by the Government of India. HLL was established in 1966 with the objective of producing condoms for the National Family Planning Program. Moods Condoms came into existence in mid-1968, when HLL Lifecare Limited decided to develop a product to target the premium and upper middle class segment of the urban population in India. HLL is one of the world's largest manufacturers of condoms. As of December 2012, its annual production totals around 800 million pieces across the globe.

== Branding ==
The logo of the brand OO represents the bonding between couples. It has diversified into several variants. The range includes close to twenty variants.

== See also ==
- KamaSutra (brand)
