= Lakshmipat Singhania Academy =

Group of schools in India

- India

Information
- School type: Private
- Mottoes: Gyanam Amritam
- Founder: Lala Lakshmipat Singhania
- School board: CBSE
- Director: Mrs. Meena Kak
- Language: English

Lakshmipat Singhania Academy (LSA) are a group of schools run by Lakshmipat Singhania Education Foundation, a subsidiary of the J.K. Group. There are two branches of LSA - in Kolkata, West Bengal and Bissau, Jhunjhunu District, Rajasthan. The schools are affiliated to the Central Board of Secondary Education. They are coeducational schools with classes ranging from Pre-Primary to Secondary level.

== History ==
The Lakshmipat Singhania Education Foundation was founded in the 1960s to promote education in India. The Kolkata branch of the school opened in 1996. It is located at the intersection of Alipore Road and Judge's Court Road.

== Student life ==
The Kolkata Branch has four houses- Vayu (yellow), Agni (red), Jal (blue) and Prithvi (green). The students are divided into four houses, and a number of events are organised in which the houses compete against each other. The Student Council and Committee elections are held each year in which students choose their representatives for the whole year.

A student from the Kolkata branch topped West Bengal in the 2007 CBSE Class 12 examination.

The school fest Abhilasha is celebrated once every four years in which students from all over Kolkata take part. The last Abhilakshya was held in 2013. Kolkata's first inter-school IT fest, exe.BIT, was also organised by LSA.

Lakshmipat Singhania Academy Bissau also has four houses- Agni(red), Jal(blue), Prithvi(green), and Vayu(yellow. The students are divided into these four houses, and intra-school activities are organised around the year, in which these houses compete against each other. Elections are held every year, in which the students vote, and choose their prefects.

An annual function (Founder's Day) is held every year, for which a grand exhibition is held in the school, and cultural programs are organised for the guests.

== Major awards ==
- Telegraph School of the year award - 2005
- Telegraph School of the year award - 2007
- International School Award (given by the British Council) - 2007 to 2010
- Intel Awards for best integration of technology in education - 2007
- International Space Settlement Design Competition 2013 as team Grumbo Aerospace.
- International Space Settlement Design Competition 2014 as team Rockdonell.
- International Space Settlement Design Competition 2019 as team Rockdonell.
- International Space Settlement Design Competition 2023 as team DAFC.
- International Space Settlement Design Competition 2024 as team Vulture Aviation.

== Notable alumni ==
- Saurav Ghosal - squash, current World Rank 17
- Sohini Paul - actress
- Jaimin Rajani - Composer, Singer-Songwriter

== Results ==
The 2012 of AISSCE 2012 resulted in 54 students getting above 90% aggregate.
