= Padampat Singhania =

Indian businessman (1905–1979)

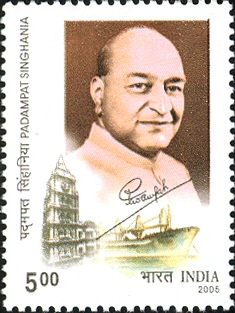
- Born: 3 February 1905; Cawnpore, United Provinces of Agra and Oudh, British India
- Died: 18 December 1979 (aged 74); Kanpur, Uttar Pradesh, India

Sir Lala Padampat Singhania (3 February 1905 – 18 December 1979) was an Indian industrialist and member of the Indian Constituent Assembly. He had been one time, youngest FICCI president during 1935-36.

== Biography ==
He was born in Kanpur into a prominent Marwari family, the oldest grandson of Lala Juggilal and son of Lala Kamlapat Singhania. His brothers were Kailashpat (who owned Raymonds) and Lakshmipat Singhania. He was survived by four sons namely Gopal Krishna, Gaur Hari, Govind Hari and Shyam Hari.

He was chairman of the JK Mills, part of the J. K. Organisation. He was knighted in the 1943 New Year Honours list, and invested with his knighthood by the Viceroy of India, the Marquess of Linlithgow, at Viceroy's House (now Rashtrapati Bhavan) in New Delhi on 23 February. After independence in 1947, he became a member of the Indian Constituent Assembly and was one of the signatories of the Indian constitution, but chose not to enter politics.

== Philanthropy ==
Singhania established Juhari Devi Girls' P.G. College in 1963 in memory of his maternal grandmother, Juhari Devi.

== Additional reading ==
- Sir Padampat Singhania: A Man of All Seasons, Niyogi Books, 2011, ISBN 9788189738730
