= Lala Lakshmipat Singhania =

Indian entrepreneur and industrialist (1910–1976)

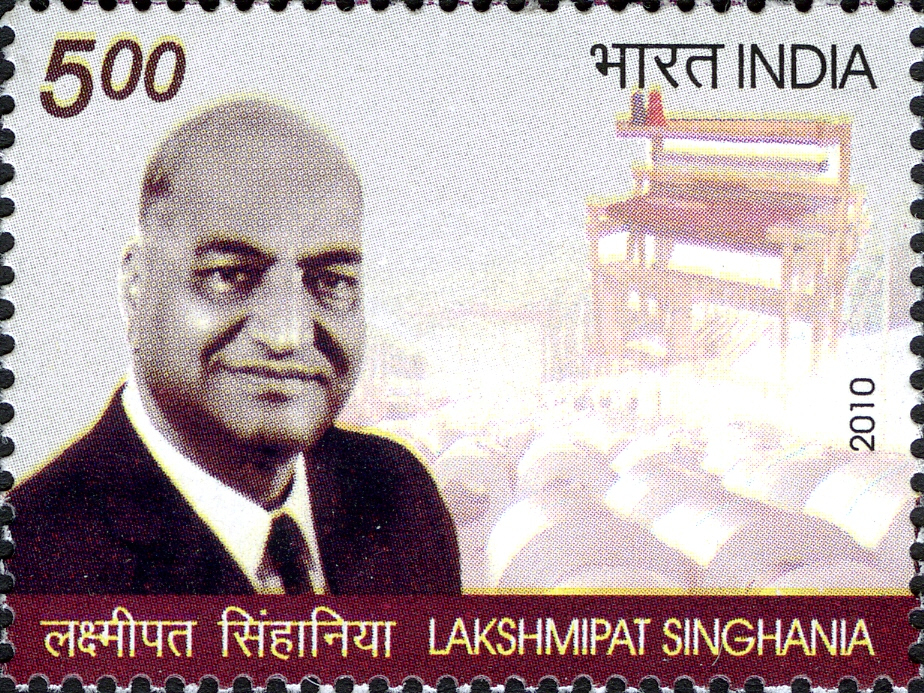
Singhania on a 2010 stamp of India

Lala Lakshmipat Singhania (1910–1976) was a pioneering Indian entrepreneur and industrialist. A son of the prominent industrialist Lala Kamlapat Singhania, he was a key architect of J. K. Organisation, one of India's largest business houses, and he endowed the Lakshmipat Singhania Academy.

In 2010 a commemorative stamp was issued to mark the centenary of his birth.
