= Ryyty =

Indian garment accessories company

Ryyty Apparel Resources
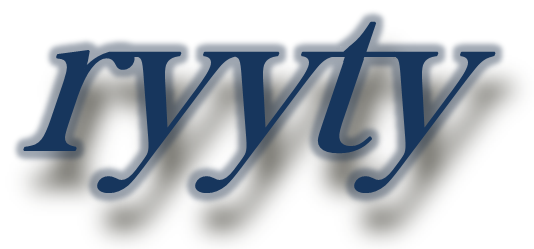
- Company type: Private
- Industry: Accessories for the garment, backpack and textile industries
- Founded: 1865 Z.A. Frankel GmbH; 1997 Butonia India
- Key people: Chairman: Ilan Shavit; Manager: Ravishankar Seshan
- Number of employees: 15
- Website: www.ryyty.com

Ryyty is an Asian group of companies trading in garment trimmings and supplying accessories to the textile industry with a direct family history of 146 years. Ryyty Apparel Resources India is a rebrand of Butonia (India) Ltd. The Butonia group originated in mid-19th century Germany and spread throughout Western Europe and Asia in the 20th century. Ryyty offers a range of buttons, zippers, fastenings, click-locks, buckles, cord ends etc. for the garment, backpack, textile and related industries. Ryyty also specialises in providing support to textile companies worldwide, from initial design to final manufacture.

The original company was founded in 1865 by Zadok Alexander Frankel in Frankfurt, Germany under the name Z.A. Frankel GmbH. Zadok Alexander Frankel's widow, Regina Frankel, continued to run the company for over 40 years, after his early demise. The company was then jointly run by Max Frankel, Regina's son, and Salomon Stiebel, her son-in-law, until the 1930s-1940s. Subsequently thereto, the greatly expanded corporate group was managed from London by Ernest Frankel, Max's son, and Richard Stiebel, Salomon's son, until the late 1980s-1990s.

The company expanded outside Germany under the name Butonia in the early 20th century to Britain, Switzerland and the Netherlands and after the Second World War to Sweden, Belgium and Finland. In the 1930s the original German company was expropriated from its German-Jewish owners, the Frankel-Stiebel family, by the Nazi regime and renamed KHG - Knopf Handelsgesellschaft GmbH, a formal name that the German Butonia company still bears today.

In the 1930s, the Frankel-Stiebel family relocated to London, England and the British company, Butonia (London) Ltd., became the main group company. In the Netherlands, the Guggenheim family were partners in Butonia BV with the British shareholders prior to the Second World War, became joint shareholders of the entire group in 1994 and bought out the European companies from the Frankel-Stiebel families in 2002.

In 1997 and 2000, respectively, Butonia opened subsidiaries in Bangalore, India and Hong Kong. These businesses were taken over by the Ruby Enterprises group in late 2002, headed by Ilan Shavit, the son of Richard Stiebel, the grandson of Salomon Stiebel and the great-grandson of Zadok Alexander Frankel. Ilan Shavit serves as the current Chairman of Ryyty. Butonia India was rebranded as ryyty in 2011. The source of the name is "fashion" in Sanskrit and "spice" in Finnish. One such spice is Saffron, an important colour in India and Hinduism, known in Hebrew and Arabic as Zafran, evocative of the original name of the company, Z.A. Frankel, founded in Germany in 1865. Ryyty thus continued in Asia in the 21st century, a business commenced in Europe in the 19th century, by the same family, four generations earlier.

In 2012, Ryyty opened a sourcing branch in Guangzhou, China.
