= HLL Lifecare =

Company in Thiruvananthapuram, India

HLL Lifecare Limited
- Type: State-owned enterprise
- Industry: Healthcare, Healthcare Infrastructure Consultancy
- Founded: 1966; 60 years ago
- Headquarters: Thiruvananthapuram, Kerala, India
- Key people: Dr. Anitha Thampi (Chairman & Managing director)
- Products: Condoms; Hormonal contraception; Surgical equipment
- Revenue: ₹5808 crores (2025-26)
- Net income: ₹400 crores (2025-26)
- Website: www.lifecarehll.com

HLL Lifecare Limited (formerly Hindustan Latex Limited) (HLL) is an Indian healthcare product manufacturing company based in Thiruvananthapuram, Kerala, India. It is a Government of India-owned corporation (public-sector undertaking).

== Products ==
It produces health care products, including condoms, contraceptive pills, IUDs, surgical sutures, blood bags and Pharma products. One of HLL's contraceptive products is ormeloxifene, branded as Saheli, the world's first and only oral non-hormonal, non-steroidal oral contraceptive, taken as a weekly pill. In 2012, HLL announced a polymerase chain reaction based duplex test kit for chikungunya and dengue fever tests in collaboration with the Rajiv Gandhi Centre for Biotechnology, Trivandrum. In December 2015, they tied up with the Government of India in setting up Amrit pharmacies across India for providing cheaper medicines for Cancer and Cardiovascular disorders. The name Amrit stands for Affordable Medicines and Reliable Implants for Treatment.

== History ==
In 2005, HLL established LifeSpring Hospitals, a 50-50 joint venture with the Acumen Fund, a U.S.-based nonprofit global venture philanthropy fund, to provide low-cost maternity services, starting at Hyderabad. Today it has nine hospitals across Andhra Pradesh state.

In February 2014, HLL acquired 74% Equity in Goa Antibiotics and Pharmaceuticals Ltd.

HLL has its head office in Thiruvananthapuram and factories in 7 locations across India. Four of the factories were built in Kerala, such as Peroorkada, Aakkulam, Kakkanad and Irapuram. The rest 3 factories are in Belgaum, Manesar, and Indore.

HLL currently has 220 pathology labs, 47 imaging centres and 6 labs under the brand name Hindlabs. It runs a total of 253 pharmacies across India. HLL runs a subsidiary with the name of HLL Infra Tech Services Ltd. In 2020-21 the company reported a turnover of ₹5,081 crore.

In 2022 due to growing cases of stroke, the cabinet gave permission to have a collaboration with HLL Lifecare to build a hub and spoke model at various primary health centres (PHCs) for the required treatment.

== HLL divestment bid ==
On 8 January 2018, the Government of India approved the privatisation of HLL Lifecare. But the Ministry of Health and Family Welfare and the Government of Kerala has opposed the Union Government's plan for disinvestment of HLL Lifecare Limited. In 2021, the Central Government eventually finalized its plans to divest its whole stake in the company which will make it a private company. The Finance Ministry's Department of Investment and Public Asset Management (DIPAM) on 14 November 2021, revealed a large portion of the company's business comes from central government projects.

== See also ==
- Ormeloxifene
- Economy of Thiruvananthapuram
- Moods Condoms
