= Shiv Ganga Degree College =

College in India

Shiv Ganga Degree College is located in Ramnagar Ghansiyari Mauaima Prayagraj, on the border between Prayagraj district and Pratapgarh district, Uttar Pradesh, India. The college was founded by Prof. Sheo Sagar Ojha.

Shiv Ganga Degree College was established by Samaj Evam Paryavaran Vikas Sansthan. On Gurupurnima 3 July 2023 Shiv Ganga Degree College has been inaugurated and dedicated by Smt Sita Ojha President of Samaj Evam Paryavaran Vikas Sansthan.

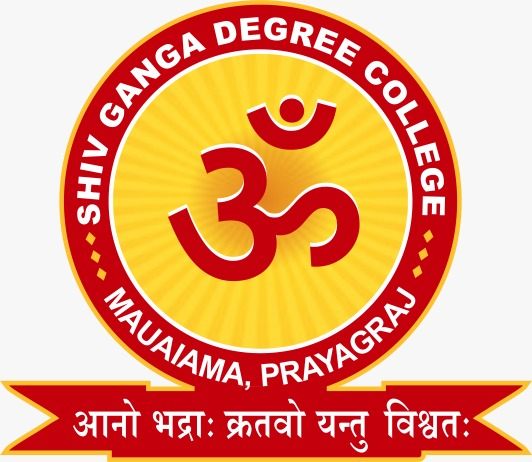
Logo is from first Shloka of Rigveda. It states welcome ideas and knowledge from all directions

The college is affiliated to Prof. Rajendra Singh (Rajju Bhaiya) University under a self-finance scheme. Shiv Ganga Degree College offers undergraduate courses in Humanities, B.A in Geography, Economics, Political Science, Sociology, History, Hindi literature & English literature Science B Sc in Maths, Physics, Chemistry, Zoology, Botany and Commerce B.Com. in Business Studies, Economics & Accountancy . Shiv Ganga Degree College offers seats to students from Uttarakhand, Nepal and Kashmiri Pandits.
