= Corporate sourcing =

Corporate sourcing refers to a system where divisions of companies coordinate the procurement and distribution of materials, parts, equipment, and supplies for the organization. This is a supply chain, purchasing/procurement, and inventory function. This enables bulk discounting, auditing, and Sarbanes-Oxley compliance.

Duties of a corporate sourcing agent include:

1. Coordinating all activities related to procurement of a commodity beginning with intent to purchase through delivery
2. Analyzing the requirements of the commodity, including preliminary specifications, preferred supplier, and date commodity is needed
3. Soliciting and evaluating proposals for the requested commodity. Investigating and/or interviewing potential suppliers to determine if they meet the specified requirements.

Some of corporate sourcing agents: Richman Chemical, Onetouch, Worldwide Brands, SAOS

== See also ==
- Second-tier sourcing
