= Ilan Shavit =

Israeli lawyer (born 1958)

- אילן שביט
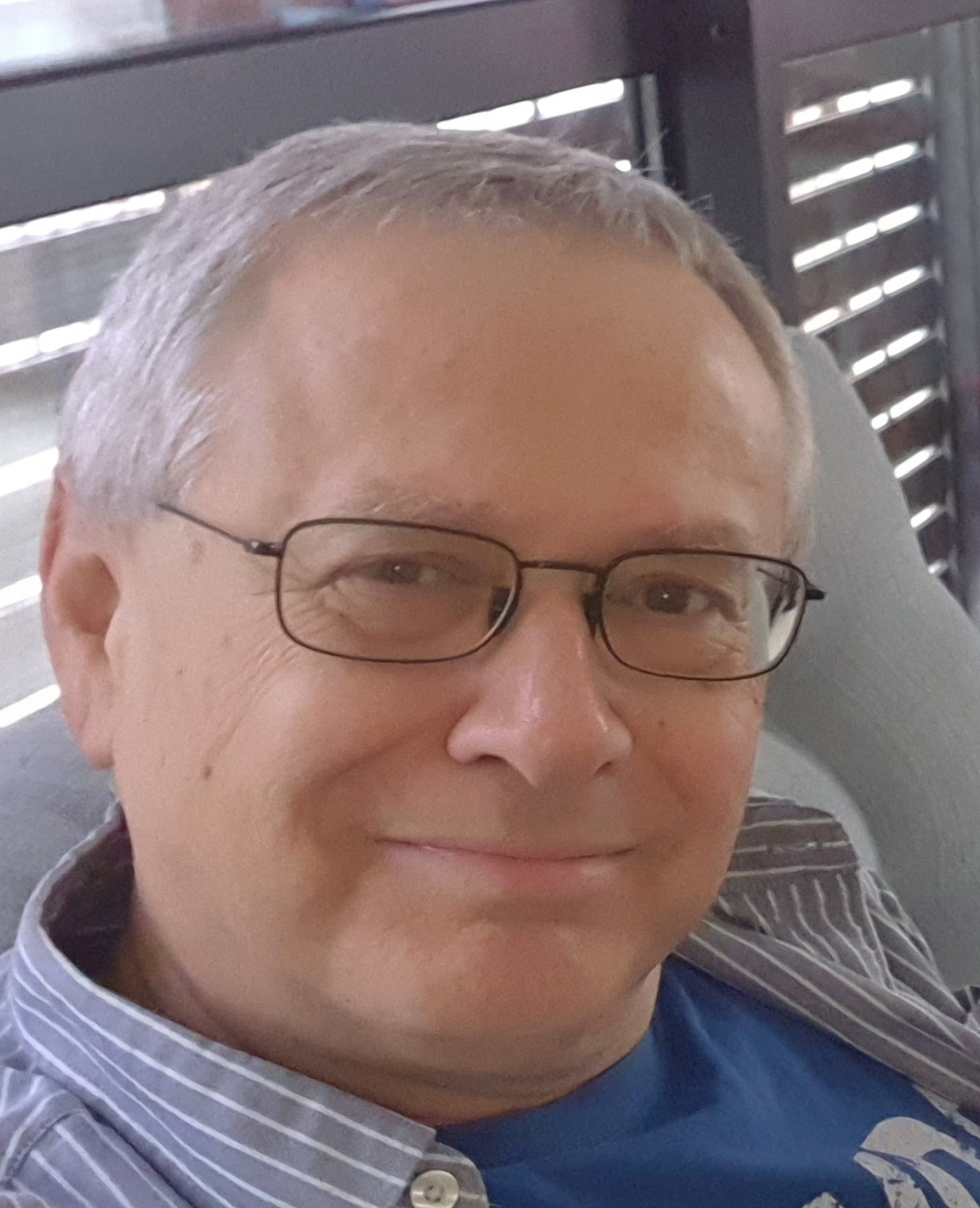
- Shavit in 2021
- Born: July 31, 1958 (age 68); London, England; Emigrated; July 26, 1972; Jerusalem, Israel
- Education: Hebrew University of Jerusalem
- Employer(s): Shavit Bar-On Gal-On Tzin Yagur (founding partner); Tel Aviv, Israel
- Military career
- Allegiance: Israel
- Branch: Israel Defense Forces
- Service years: 1977–1981 (reg); 1981-2005 (res)
- Rank: Rav Seren (Major)
- Unit: Paratroopers Brigade
- Conflicts: Litani Operation; 1982 Lebanon War; First Intifada
- Website: www.shaviram.com

Ilan Shavit (Hebrew: אילן שביט; born 31 July 1958) is an Israeli lawyer, businessman and entrepreneur. Shavit is a founding partner of the commercial and corporate Tel Aviv law firm Shavit Bar-On Gal-On Tzin Yagur and of the Shaviram property group.

== Personal ==
Ilan Shavit was born in London, England and studied at Barclay House School and JFS. He immigrated to Israel in 1972 and studied at the Gymnasia Rehavia in Jerusalem from which he graduated in 1976. In 1986 he relocated with his family to Tel Aviv.

== Legal education and career ==
Shavit graduated from the Law Faculty of the Hebrew University of Jerusalem in 1984 and continued LL.M studies at that faculty. He was a lecturer in Public International Law in the Hebrew University Law Faculty and a member of the Law Review editorial board.

From 1983 to 1985, Shavit clerked at the Supreme Court of Israel under Justice Gabriel Bach and in Raveh, Abramson & Co. In 1985-1992 he worked as an associate lawyer with Raveh, Abramson & Co., Dan Cohen & Co. and Dan Cohen, Spigelman & Co, where he was a partner until the founding of Shavit, Bar-On & Co. in 1992. Shavit, Bar-On & Co. merged with Gal-On, Tzin & Co. in 2005.

Shavit's main spheres of activities were foreign and local corporate law and international transactions and corporate structures, hi-tech, bio-tech and start-up corporate incorporation and financing, private equity, real estate equity, shareholder rights and other fields of corporate law.

Shavit also practiced municipal law and in 2003-2005 he developed and proposed a two-tier municipal government structure, which was adopted by the Israeli Interior Ministry in Neve Monosson and Maccabim-Re'ut, in which the first boroughs in Israel were created. Shavit served as an elected member of the Yehud-Monosson City Council, representing the community of Neve Monosson and was a member of the City Planning Commission from 2003 to 2006. In 2007, Shavit was appointed by the City Council to the position of Mayoral Advisor for Community Administration.

== Business career ==
Shavit is active as a founder, investor and corporate director in technological, medical and trading enterprises. Shavit is the Chairman of Ryyty, a multi-national group of trading companies which continued the Asian businesses of the Butonia group. Shavit is a founder and director of UTC - Underwater Technology Center, an advanced underwater communications company, and of the Shamdon Globe and Shaviram real estate private equity groups, which invest in commercial real estate in England and the United States. Shavit is one of the investor-founders of the medical devices companies Medigus (TASE: MDGS), OrCam and PulseNMore (TASE: PULS).

== Military service ==
Shavit served in the regular IDF from 1977 to 1981, in the Paratroopers Brigade, with which he participated in the 1978 Litani Operation, and in the 932 Nahal Battalion as a platoon and deputy company commander in the Jordan Valley. Shavit served in the IDF reserves, from 1981 to 2003, as a Platoon Commander in the 1982 First Lebanon War and 1988-1993 First Intifada, and as a Battalion Intelligence Officer and Comptroller Officer in the Inspection and Supervision Division of the General Staff, reaching the rank of Rav Seren (Major).
