= Butonia =

Butonia Group Logo

Butonia is a multi-national European group of companies trading in garment trimmings and supplying accessories to the textile industry. The group originated in mid-19th century Germany and spread throughout Western Europe and Asia in the 20th century. Butonia offers a range of buttons, zippers, fastenings, click-locks, buckles, cord ends etc. for the garment, backpack, textile and related industries. Butonia also specialises in providing support to textile companies worldwide, from initial design to final manufacture.

Butonia was founded in 1865 by Zadok Alexander Frankel in Frankfurt, Germany under the name Z.A. Frankel & Co.. Zadok Alexander Frankels's widow, Regina Frankel, continued to run the company for over 40 years, after his early demise. The company was then jointly run by Max Frankel, Regina's son, and Salomon Stiebel, her son-in-law, until the 1930s–1940s. Subsequently, the greatly expanded corporate group was managed from London by Ernest Frankel, Max's son, and Richard Stiebel, Salomon's son, until the late 1980s–1990s.

Butonia expanded in the early 20th century to Britain, Switzerland and the Netherlands and after the Second World War to Sweden, Belgium and Finland. In the 1930s the original German company was expropriated from its German-Jewish owners, the Frankel-Stiebel family, by the Nazi regime and renamed KHG - Knopf Handelsgesellschaft GmbH, a formal name that the German Butonia company still bears today.

In the 1930s, the Frankel-Stiebel family relocated to London, England and the British company, Butonia (London) Ltd., became the main group company. In the Netherlands, the Guggenheim family were partners in Butonia BV with the British shareholders prior to the Second World War, became joint shareholders of the entire group in 1994 and bought out the other shareholder groups in 2002. In 2003 Butonia opened a subsidiary in Lithuania in order to deal with increasing Eastern European manufacture.

In 1997 and 2000, respectively, Butonia opened subsidiaries in Bangalore, India and Hong Kong. These businesses were taken over by the Ruby Enterprises group in late 2002, headed by Ilan Shavit, the son of Richard Stiebel, and were rebranded in India and Guangzhou, China as Ryyty Apparel Resources in 2009.
