= LifeSpring Hospitals =

- Type: Private (joint venture of HLL and Acumen)
- Founded: 10 December 2005; 20 years ago
- Headquarters: Hyderabad, India
- Number of locations: 10 (2025)
- Key people: Dr Roy Sebastian, Head (HR); Subba Rao, Head (Finance)
- Services: health care/maternity care
- Website: www.lifespring.in

LifeSpring Hospitals is an Indian hospital chain, which provides maternity care to women from the low-income group in Hyderabad, India. Established in 2005, it is a 50-50 joint venture between $30-million Acumen Fund, a U.S.-based nonprofit global venture philanthropy fund and HLL Lifecare Limited, a Government of India -owned corporation and the largest manufacturer of condoms in the world.

As of October 2025 it provided affordable healthcare to 5,500,000 women with its ten hospitals in Hyderabad, providing maternity and pediatric care at 30-50 percent of market rates, and is the first healthcare chain to join the 'Business Call to Action' (BCA), an initiative of United Nations Development Programme (UNDP) and UN Global Compact amongst others, to reduce poverty, hunger, disease, and maternal and child deaths by 2015.

== History ==
The first LifeSpring hospital was established on 10 December 2005 in Moula-Ali, on the outskirts on Hyderabad, India, as a pilot project within Hindustan Latex Family Planning Promotion Trust (HLFPPT) of Hindustan Latex Limited, now HLL Lifecare Limited (HLL) for low-cost healthcare. In February 2008, it was formed as into a private limited company with 50-50 joint venture between Acumen Fund, a U. S.-based nonprofit global venture philanthropy fund and HLL. The project was headed by Anant Kumar, who was till then the business head of Social Franchising in HLFPPT, who later became Life-Spring's CEO. HLL is a public-sector undertaking under the Ministry of Health and Family Welfare, Government of India, while New York-based Acumen, was established in 2001, with seed capital from the Rockefeller Foundation, Cisco Systems Foundation and three individual philanthropists.

The hospital established a model of building a chain of small-sized (25-bed) hospitals specializing in standard maternity services thus provide low-cost services in high-density area populated by low-income groups. It also provides pediatric care, including immunizations, and offers diagnostic services, pharmacy and healthcare education to the local communities. It uses CRM to track customers in real time and runs a web-based patient database.

Mr. Anant Kumar was part of the roundtable of "entrepreneurs with innovative models", at the Trident Hotel, Mumbai, during the November 2010, visit of US president, Barack Obama. Mr. Anant Kumar was the CEO of LifeSpring till January 2013. Later, Mr. Sushmit Mitra the CEO till June 2017.

Currently, LifeSpring Hospitals offers its services through 10 branches spread out in the twin cities of Hyderabad-Secunderabad, Telangana, India. Since inception LifeSpring has delivered a total of 85,000 healthy babies. Annually, LifeSpring Hospitals deliver about 6% babies born in the city of Hyderabad.

== See also ==
- List of hospitals in India
