= Ormeloxifene =

Chemical compound

Clinical data
- Trade names: Centron, Novex-DS, Saheli, Sevista, Chhaya
- Other names: Centchroman
- Routes of administration: By mouth
- Drug class: Selective estrogen receptor modulator
- ATC code: G03XC04 (WHO)

Legal status
- Legal status: US: Not FDA approved; Rx-only in India

Pharmacokinetic data
- Elimination half-life: 7 days

Identifiers
- IUPAC name: 1-[2-[4-[(3S,4S)-7-methoxy-2,2-dimethyl-3-phenyl-chroman-4-yl]phenoxy]ethyl]pyrrolidine
- CAS Number: 31477-60-8
- PubChem CID: 154413
- ChemSpider: 32935
- UNII: 44AXY5VE90
- KEGG: D08301
- ChEMBL: ChEMBL301327

Chemical and physical data
- Formula: C_{30}H_{35}NO_{3}
- Molar mass: 457.614 g·mol^{−1}
- 3D model (JSmol): Interactive image
- SMILES: CC1([C@@H]([C@H](c2ccc(cc2O1)OC)c3ccc(cc3)OCCN4CCCC4)c5ccccc5)C
- InChI: InChI=1S/C30H35NO3/c1-30(2)29(23-9-5-4-6-10-23)28(26-16-15-25(32-3)21-27(26)34-30)22-11-13-24(14-12-22)33-20-19-31-17-7-8-18-31/h4-6,9-16,21,28-29H,7-8,17-20H2,1-3H3/t28-,29+/m0/s1; Key:XZEUAXYWNKYKPL-URLMMPGGSA-N

Ormeloxifene

Background
- Type: Antiestrogen
- First use: 1991

Failure rates (first year)
- Perfect use: 2%
- Typical use: 9%

Usage
- Duration effect: One week
- Reversibility: Immediate
- User reminders: Taken twice weekly for first 13 weeks
- Clinic review: Annually

Advantages and disadvantages
- STI protection: No
- Periods: May disrupt
- Safe while breastfeeding: Yes
- Weight: No proven effect
- Benefits: Non hormonal
- Risks: Delayed menstruation

Medical notes
- Only approved as a contraceptive in India

Ormeloxifene, also known as centchroman, is one of the selective estrogen receptor modulators, or SERMs, a class of medication which acts on the estrogen receptor. It is best known as a nonsteroidal oral contraceptive which is taken once per week. In India, ormeloxifene has been available as birth control since the early 1990s, and it was marketed there under the trade name Saheli, currently available free-of-cost for the women in India as Chhaya (Centchroman).

Ormeloxifene has also been licensed under the trade names Ormalin, Novex-DS, Centron, and Sevista.

== Medical uses ==
Ormeloxifene is primarily used as a contraceptive but may also be effective for dysfunctional uterine bleeding and advanced breast cancer.

=== Birth control ===
Ormeloxifene may be used as a weekly oral contraceptive. The weekly schedule is an advantage for women who prefer an oral contraceptive, but find it difficult or impractical to adhere to a daily schedule required by other oral contraceptives.

For the first twelve weeks of use, it is advised to take the ormeloxifene pill twice per week. From the thirteenth week on, it is taken once per week. The consensus is that backup protection in the first month is a cautious but sensible choice. A standard dose is 30 mg weekly, but 60 mg loading doses can reduce pregnancy rates by 38%.

It has a failure rate of about 1-2% with ideal use which is slightly less effective than found for combined oral contraceptive pills.

=== Other indications ===
- Ormeloxifene has also been tested in experimental setting as a treatment for menorrhagia.
- Use in treatment of mastalgia and fibroadenoma has also been described.

== Side effects ==
There are concerns that ormeloxifene may cause delayed menstruation.

== Pharmacology ==
Ormeloxifene is a selective estrogen receptor modulator (SERM). In some parts of the body, its action is estrogenic (e.g., bones), in other parts of the body, its action is antiestrogenic (e.g., uterus, breasts). It causes an asynchrony in the menstrual cycle between ovulation and the development of the uterine lining, although its exact mode of action is not well defined. In clinical trials, it caused ovulation to occur later than it normally would in some women, but did not affect ovulation in the majority of women, while causing the lining of the uterus to build more slowly. It speeds the transport of any fertilized egg through the fallopian tubes more quickly than is normal. Presumably, this combination of effects creates an environment such that if fertilization occurs, implantation will not be possible.

== History ==
Ormeloxifene was first discovered by Central Drug Research Institute (CDRI) in Lucknow, India. Ormeloxifene was marketed in Delhi in July 1991 and in India in 1992, under the brand names Saheli and Choice-7.

Since 2018, Centchroman is provided free-of-cost to the women in India by the government under the brand name Chhaya.

== Society and culture ==
=== Marketing ===
As of 2009, ormeloxifene was legally available only in India.

Ormeloxifene has been tested and licensed as a form of birth control, as well as a treatment for dysfunctional uterine bleeding.

- Manufactured by Torrent Pharmaceuticals, and marketed as birth control under the trade name Centron. Centron was discontinued.
- A new license for ormeloxifene was issued to Hindustan Latex Ltd., which now manufactures ormeloxifene as birth control under the trade names Saheli, Novex, and Novex-DS.
- Torrent Pharmaceuticals has resumed manufacture of ormeloxifene under the trade name Sevista, as a treatment for dysfunctional uterine bleeding.

== See also ==
- Levormeloxifene
