= Second-tier sourcing =

Second-tier sourcing is a procurement policy used by many Fortune 500 corporations. Second-tier sourcing is a practice of rewarding those suppliers that achieve or attempt to achieve the minority-owned business (MBE) spending goals of their customer.

The program was started by Chrysler Corporation in 1993 and now extends throughout the Fortune 500. In 2005, Toyota set a goal of 10% for their suppliers and holds an annual matchmaking event to help their suppliers achieve those goals.
