= Richman Chemical =

Chemical sourcing company

- Industry: Chemical sourcing
- Founded: 1988
- Founder: Ed Richman, Ph.D.
- Headquarters: Lower Gwynedd, Pennsylvania, United States
- Area served: Pharmaceutical, medical device, biotech, emerging technology, personal care, nutritional, and diagnostic testing companies
- Services: Custom Chemical Synthesis, Toll Manufacturing, Chemical Sourcing, Nutritional Sourcing, Project Management
- Website: www.richmanchemical.com

Richman Chemical Inc. (RCI) is a chemical sourcing company founded in 1988 by Ed Richman Ph.D., located in Lower Gwynedd, Pennsylvania.

Richman Chemical Inc. provides project management, custom/contract manufacturing and sourcing services to life science and chemical industry clients. Richman Chemical Inc. represents a wide range network of manufacturers on a project-by-project or client-by-client basis.

The origin of the business model dates back to Dr. Richman’s tenure as a director of non-core business units for several Fortune 100 chemical companies. He observed first-hand the intricacies of outsourcing within the chemical industry and parlayed that experience into the establishment of Richman Chemical, helping clients use resources more efficiently and spend less time outsourcing and more time in their area of expertise.

Dr. Richman began taking his business model “on the road” to, among others, emerging technology audiences. His recent presentation on Effective Outsourcing for Start Up Companies at BioStrategy Partners highlighted the pros and cons of outsourcing and how early-stage companies can outsource effectively. He also participated in a webcam interview with Andrew Warner, the founder of Mixergy, to share his story of an entrepreneur who started his chemical business in his late 40s after years in the corporate world.
