= Allahabad State University =

State university in Allahabad, India

Prof. Rajendra Singh (Rajju Bhaiya) University
- Other names: Allahabad State University (former, colloquial)
- Type: State University
- Established: 17 June 2016 (10 years ago)
- Affiliations: UGC
- Chancellor: Governor of Uttar Pradesh
- Vice-Chancellor: Akhilesh Kumar Singh
- Location: Prayagraj, Uttar Pradesh, India
- Campus: Urban
- Website: prsuniv.ac.in

Allahabad State University (ASU), officially known as Prof. Rajendra Singh (Rajju Bhaiya) University (PRSU), is a state university located in Prayagraj, Uttar Pradesh, India. Established in 2016, it has jurisdiction over the four districts of the Prayagraj division.

== History ==
Allahabad State University was established through the Uttar Pradesh State Universities (Amendment) Act, 2013, which sought to establish a state university in Prayagraj since the University of Allahabad was given the status of central university, leaving the district with no state university. The act gave the university jurisdiction over the colleges in the four districts of Prayagraj division, Prayagraj, Kaushambi, Fatehpur and Pratapgarh, previously affiliated to Chhatrapati Shahu Ji Maharaj University and Dr. Ram Manohar Lohia Avadh University. However, due to difficulties in transferring the land, the construction of the university was delayed until 2016, when it was announced on the 2016 budget that funds were assigned and the land was identified for the university, leading to the official date of establishment on 17 June 2016. In 2018, following the renaming of Allahabad to Prayagraj, proposals were made to rename the university as well. In 2019, through an ordinance, the university was renamed after Rajendra Singh, the fourth Sarsanghchalak (Chief) of the Rashtriya Swayamsevak Sangh, a right-wing Hindutva paramilitary organisation. Later that year, the ordinance was replaced by the Uttar Pradesh State Universities (Amendment) Act, 2019.

The first vice-chancellor of the university was Rajendra Prasad, who was originally appointed Officer on Special Duty (OSD) for the establishment of the university. Prasad was replaced by Sangeeta Srivastava in June 2019. Srivastava resided until November 2020, when she was appointed VC of the University of Allahabad and replaced with K.N. Singh, which took the position as an additional charge. In March 2021 Akhilesh Kumar Singh took charge as VC.
