= KamaSutra (brand) =

India's second largest condom brand

KamaSutra aaIndia
- Current owner: J.K. Ansell Ltd. (JKAL)
- Country: India
- Introduced: 1991; 35 years ago
- Markets: 70 countries
- Previous owners: J.K. Chemicals Ltd.
- Website: kamasutra.in

KamaSutra Condoms is India's second largest condom brand. It is manufactured by J.K. Ansell Ltd. (JKAL), which was a 50:50 joint venture between Raymond Group, India's largest fabric and branded apparel company, and Ansell, the Australian company which makes latex and rubber products. It is now owned wholly by Raymond. JKAL has a condom manufacturing unit in Aurangabad in the state of Maharashtra, India with a manufacturing capacity of 350 million pieces per annum. JKAL commenced operations in 1991 and launched KamaSutra condoms the same year. Prior to the formation of the joint venture in 1996, the condom division was part of J.K. Chemicals Ltd., a subsidiary of the Raymond Group.

KamaSutra has a range of textured and other special interest condoms – Dotted, Ribbed, Contoured, LongLast, Superthin, Intensity (multi-textured), Smooth (plain, extra lubricated), extra large, flared and flavored/scented condoms.

== Marketing ==
It is remembered for its launch campaign in 1991, featuring two of India's top models of the time – Pooja Bedi and Marc Robinson, shot by Prabuddha Dasgupta.

In April 2009, KamaSutra condoms launched a new viral initiative which aimed at reminding people to use condoms. This initiative was designed to take advantage of a key consumer behavioural insight – sex is mostly searched, seen, found, discussed and accessed primarily using a computer. Hence, a desktop application which uses a keystroke sensor, KamaSutra condom pack that drops down whenever the user types anything related to sex. This application can be shared between friends through the internet, where a person can select the KamaSutra condom variant, insert a personalized message for a friend and the next time the friend types anything related to sex, this condom drops down with his message on it, the intention being that this is a fun yet relevant reminder from a friend to wear a condom.

== See also ==
- Moods Condoms
- Viveka Babajee
