= Raymond Group =

Indian fashion retailing company

- Type: Public Company
- Industry: Textiles, Engineering, Aviation & Real estate
- Founded: 1925; 101 years ago
- Founder: Albert Raymond
- Headquarters: Mumbai, Maharashtra, India
- Key people: Gautam Singhania (Chairman)
- Products: Fabrics, garments, designer wear, denim, cosmetics & toiletries, engineering files & tools, prophylactics and air charter services
- Revenue: ₹5,913 crore (US$610 million) (2023)
- Subsidiaries: Raymond Ltd
- Website: www.raymond.in

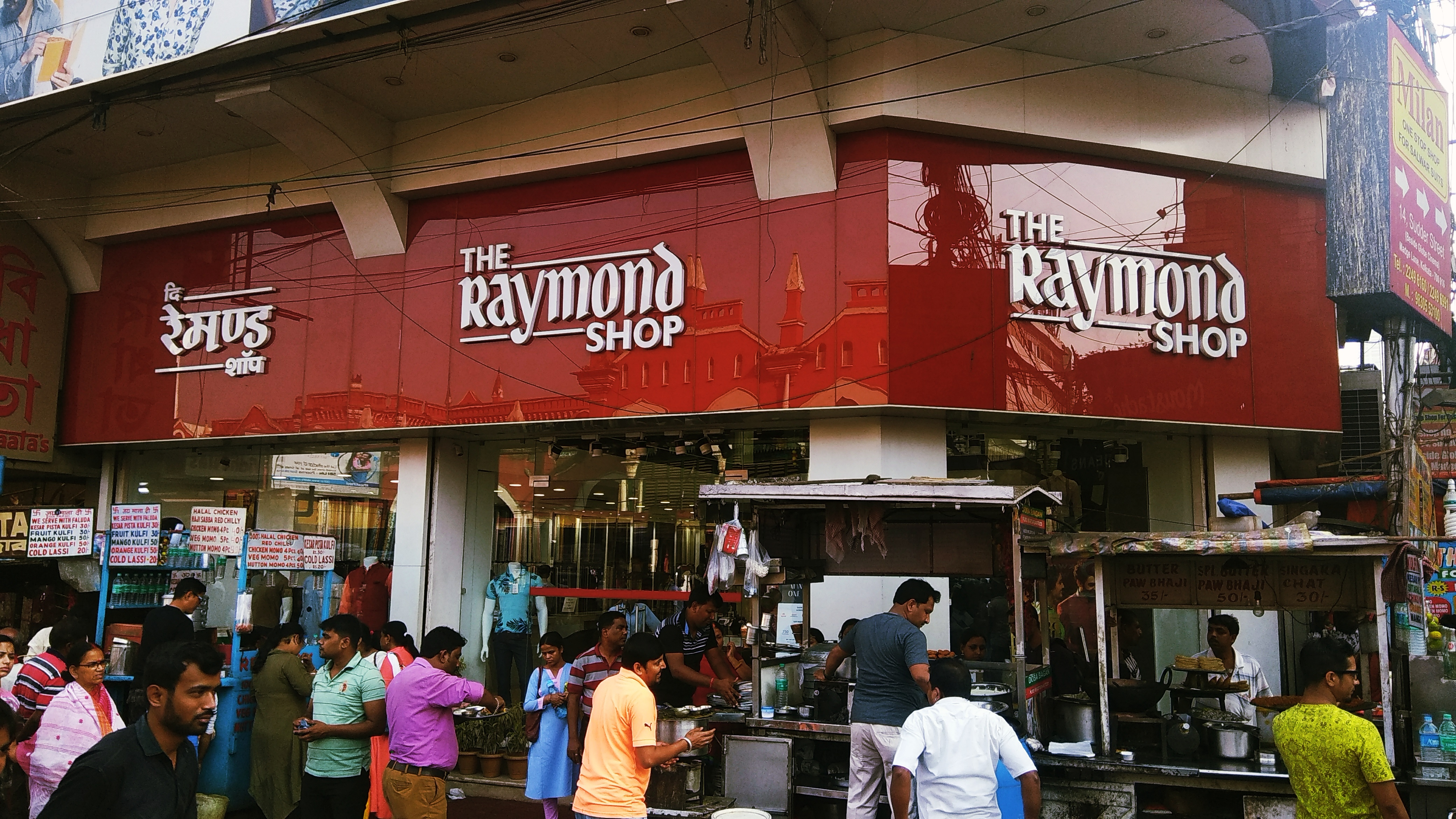
A Raymonds Store in Esplanade, Kolkata.

Raymond Group is an Indian branded fabric and fashion retailer, incorporated in 1925. It produces suiting fabric, with a capacity of producing 31 million meters of wool and wool-blended fabrics.

The group owns apparel brands like Raymond, Premium Apparel, Raymond Made to Measure, Parx, Ethnix, Park Avenue Woman ColorPlus, Kamasutra. All the brands are retailed through 'The Raymond Shop' (TRS), with a network of over 700 retail shops spread across India and overseas, in over 200 cities.

In addition, the group also has business interests in readymade garments, designer wear, cosmetics and toiletries, engineering files and tools, prophylactics and air charter operations.

== History ==
Established initially as a small woolen mill near Thane Creek in 1925, Raymond Woolen Mill developed into Raymond Ltd. following Lala Kailashpat Singhania's takeover in 1944.

The brand opened its first exclusive showroom in King's Corner, Ballard Estate Mumbai in 1958.

In 1967, the company launched Trovine, a first-of-its-kind fabric tailored to be cool and comfortable for Indian summers.

A new manufacturing facility was established in Jalgaon in 1979 in order to meet the increasing demand for worsted woolen fabrics.

In 1990, the brand inaugurated its first overseas showroom in Oman.

In the late 90's, the brand spread its business in various sectors, launching KamaSutra, Raymond Aviation, Parx, and denim manufacturing.

Mr. Gautam Singhania was appointed Chairman and Managing Director in 2000. The company acquired ColorPlus in 2002.

In 2013, Raymond opened its outlet in Karachi, Pakistan, becoming the first Indian brand to branch out into the neighboring country's retail market.

In 2015, Raymond Ltd. became the first textile company to produce in Super 250s and innovative fabrics in the world.

As of 2018, the brand has crossed the landmark of 900 stores across 500+ towns and cities in India, making this the fastest ever retail expansion by any brand.

== Expansion ==
In 2019, Raymond announced its venture into real estate business under Raymond Realty. The new venture is poised to start with an investment of ₹250 crore (approx. $36 million) in developing mid-income and premium housing units on 20 acres of land in the growing suburb of Thane. Raymond group holds over 125 acres of land in this region.

=== JK Maini Global Aerospace ===
In 2023, Raymond acquired Maini Precision Products Limited (MPPL) and established a aerospace and defence subsidiary. The arm was then diversified to operate in Precision Technology & Auto Components as well as and Aerospace & Defence.

On 1 September 2026, the aerospace arm of Raymond, JK Maini Global Aerospace, received an annual contract, worth a business potential of around ₹33 crore (US$3.4 million), from an Indian defence major. The company is expected to deliver over 300 part types, across precision-machined, cast and structural components for multiple aircraft applications, and quantities of over 37,000 components. The production under the contract with commence in phases through 2026 and 2027. On 23 September, Raymond announced that the company has received orders to supply wing and fuselage structures for a fighter aircraft programme to an Indian aerospace OEM after winning the tenders.

== See also ==
- Lakshmi Mills
- Ryyty
