= Gopal Krishna Singhania =

Indian industrialist (1933–1980)

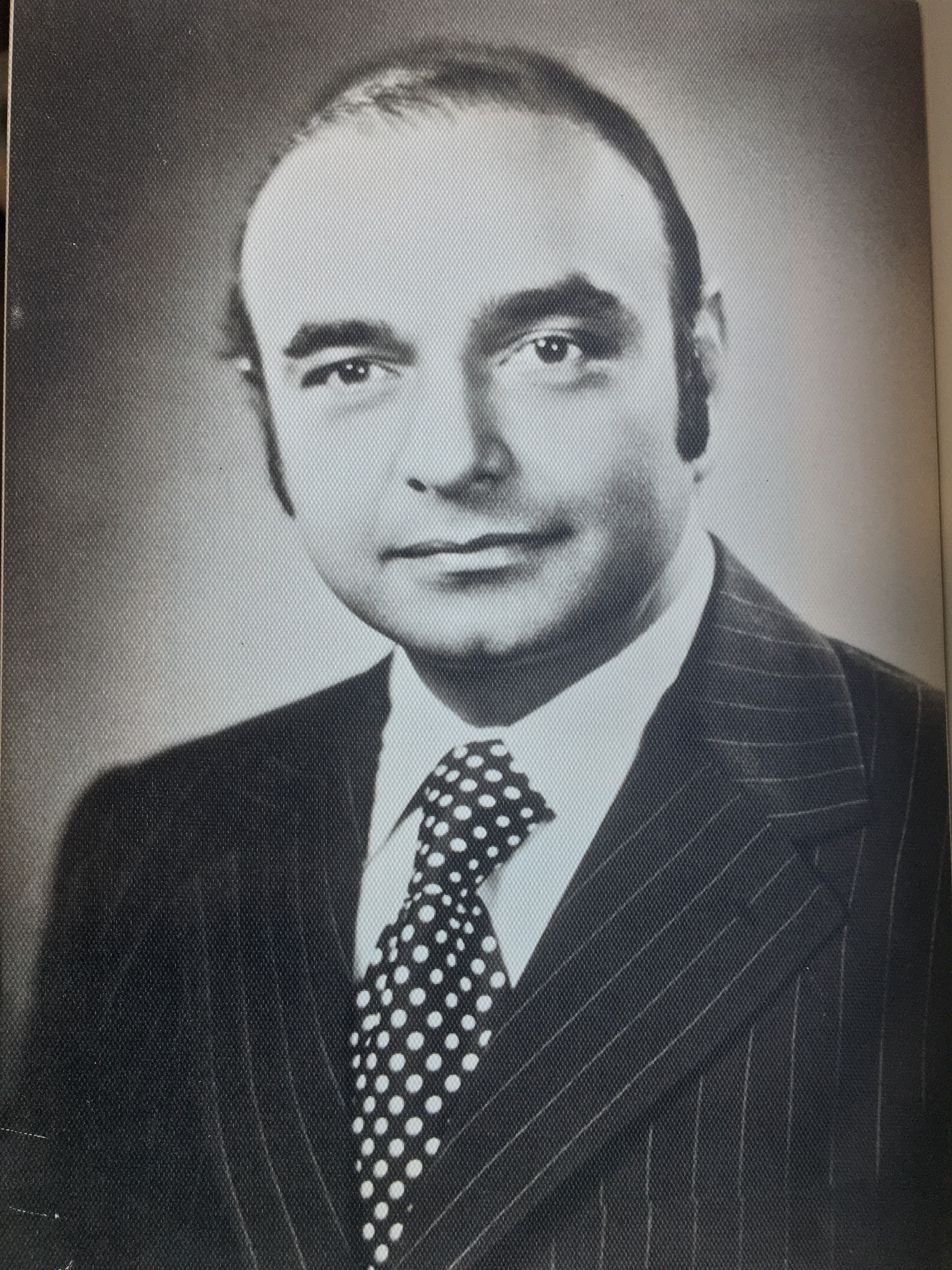
- Born: 21 June 1933
- Died: 3 January 1980 (aged 46)
- Known for: Indian Industrialist
- Spouse(s): Sulochana Devi, Kalpana Singhania
- Children: Ramapati Singhania, Nidhipati Singhania, Ambika Kothari, Gopika Singhania
- Parent(s): Padampat Singhania; Anusuya Singhania
- Family: Singhania family

Gopal Krishna Singhania was an Indian Industrialist. He was born on 21 June 1933 to Sir Padampat Singhania and Lady Anusuya Singhania of the Singhania family.

He was the youngest Chairman of Raymond Woollen Mills Ltd. He also served as the Chairman of JK Synthetics Ltd, now known as JK Enterprises, the first Indian company to produce nylon with its own polymerization process. He was also the Director of Doe Jones Investments and Consultants Pvt Ltd and The New Kaiser-I Hind Spinning and Weaving Co Ltd.

As the Chairman of Raymonds, he was instrumental in reinventing garment manufacturing in India. He introduced the cross breeding of Indian Deccani and Chokla sheep with Australian Merino rams at Raymond Wool Research and Development Division. This resulted in pioneering the production of high quality indigenous "Gopal Merino Wool" in India. In 1967, he expanded Raymond Woollen Mill Ltd into Kenya as a joint venture with 67 employees.

Gopal Krishna Singhania was first married to Mrs Sulochana Devi Singhania who died in 1967. Later he married Mrs Kalpana Singhania. He was survived by two sons namely Ramapati Singhania, Nidhipati Singhania. Gopika Singhania and Ambika Kothari are his two daughters.

Gopal Krishna Singhania established the Smt Sulochana Devi school in 1968 at Thane, Maharashtra, India in the memory of his first wife.

He died of a heart attack at the age of 47 on 3 January 1980.

The Gopal Krishna Singhania Memorial Endowment Award is bestowed by the Government of India for outstanding contributions in the field of air and water pollution control.
