= J. K. Organisation =

Indian industrial conglomerate

- Founded: 1918; 108 years ago
- Founder: Lala Juggilal Singhania & Lala Kamlapat Singhania
- Headquarters: New Delhi
- Key people: (President)
- Products: Cement, Tyres, Paper, Biotech, Chemicals, IT products, Dairy products, Seeds, Engineering equipment
- Revenue: ₹32,000 crore (US$3.3 billion)
- Number of employees: 40,000
- Subsidiaries: JK Tyre & industries; JK Lakshmi cement; JK Cement; JK Dairy; JK Insurance Brokers Limited; JK Paper; JK Fenner; JK Tech; JK Agri Genetics (JK seeds); JK Pharma-Chem; JK Super cement; JK Sugar LTD; CliniRx Research; Delopt; Global Strategic Technologies
- Website: www.jkorg.in

The J. K. Organisation is an Indian industrial conglomerate, with headquarters in Delhi, Kanpur and Mumbai. It is run by the Singhania family, which rose to prominence in Kanpur, India, under Lala Kamlapat Singhania. The name JK is derived from the initials of Kamlapat and his father Seth Juggilal (1857–1922), who belonged to the family associated with the Marwari firm Sevaram Ramrikhdas of Mirzapur. The JK Group was founded in 1918.

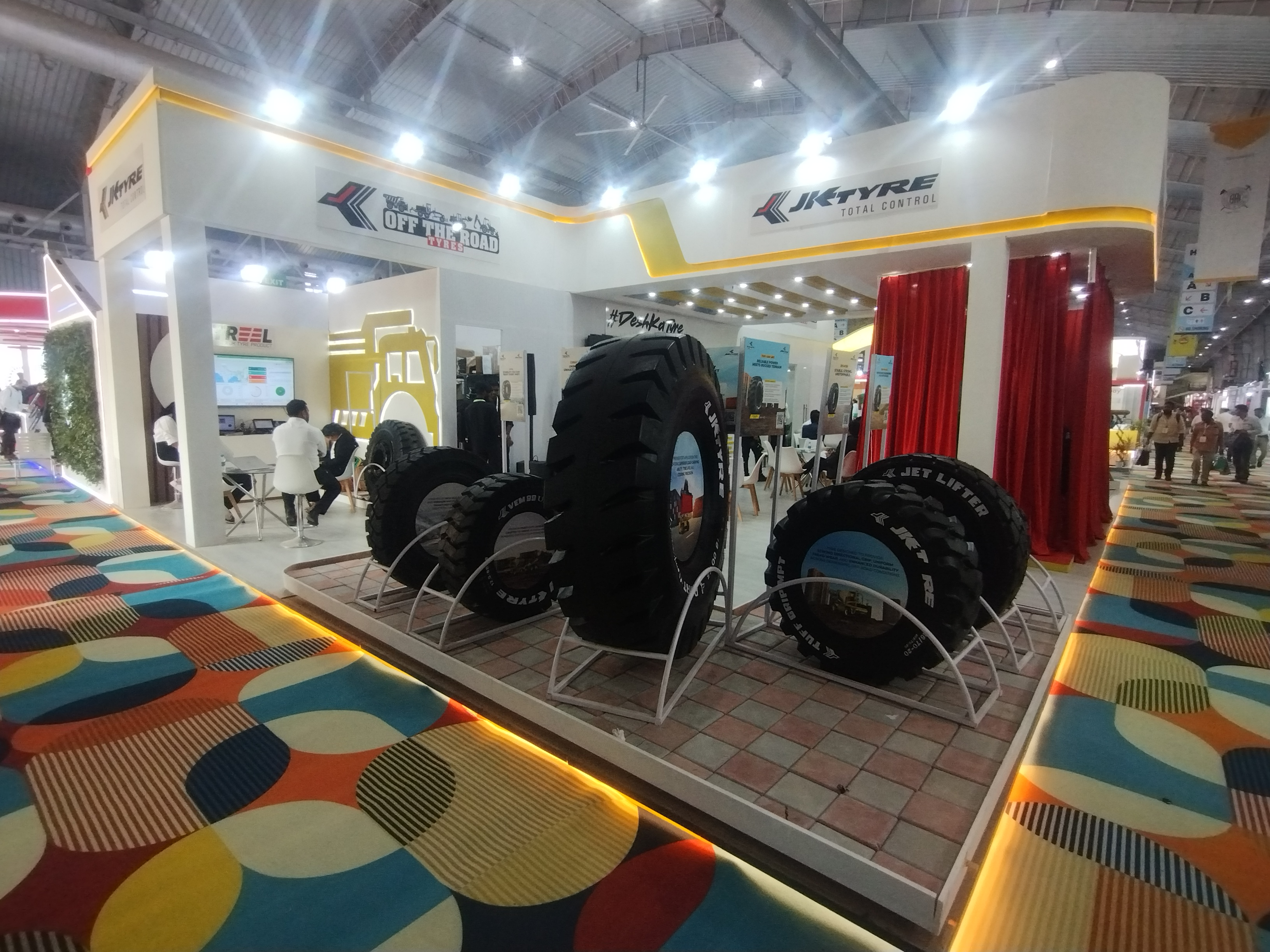
The organization's subsidiary JK Tyre, at EXCON 2025, (BIEC)

== History ==
The group rose in importance in the 1950s to 1980s, when it was the third-largest industrial conglomerate in India after the Birla and Tata conglomerates. The group has multi-business, multi-product, and multi-location operations, with interests in many countries. It has overseas manufacturing operations in Mexico, Indonesia, Romania, Belgium, Portugal, the UAE, and Switzerland. The organization also includes research and development institutes in various fields. The family is currently divided into three main groups headed by Gaur Hari Singhania based in Kanpur, Hari Shankar Singhania based in Delhi and Vijaypat Singhania based in Mumbai. The three men are cousins who now run independent businesses, which are technically and legally separate entities and have no cross-holdings or common directors and employees, sharing only the family history.
