= Hari Shankar Singhania =

Indian industrialist (1933–2013)

- Born: 20 June 1933; Kanpur, India
- Died: 22 February 2013 (aged 79); New Delhi, India
- Resting place: Nigambodh Ghat, New Delhi
- Citizenship: India
- Education: Bachelor of Science
- Occupation: Industrialist
- Years active: 1951–2013
- Employer: 30,000
- Known for: J. K. Organisation
- Awards: Padma Bhushan in 2003,
- Website: J.K. Organisation

Hari Shankar Singhania (20 June 1933 – 22 February 2013) was the President of J.K. Organisation, a leading Indian industrial group, which has its roots extending nearly 100 years, and is one of the largest industrial groups in India. It has multi-business, multi-product and multi-location operations. Most of the companies in the group are public limited entities, with more than 40,000 employees. The group has more than 500,000 shareholders, with a nationwide sales and service network of over 10,000 distributors and many retailers and service centres. The group has export interests in nearly 90 countries across the globe.

Mr. Singhania was the architect of most of the J.K. Organization group of companies which currently manufacture a large range of products including automotive tyres and tubes, paper and board, cement, V-belts, oil seals, power transmission equipment, woolen textiles, readymade suits and apparel, food and dairy products, hybrid seeds, steel engineering files, and cosmetics.

Born in Kanpur, Mr. Singhania initially worked in Kolkata. In the 1960s, he moved to Delhi and established himself as a leading industrial figure in the growing city. Throughout his life, Mr. Singhania remained active in business, political and nonprofit communities. He was offered the post of Indian Ambassador to the United States by Prime Minister PV Narasimha Rao, a position he declined. Widely travelled overseas, Mr. Singhania was a keen gardener and an enthusiastic photographer.

== He has served as ==
Within J.K. Organisation

- Chairman, JK Paper Ltd.
- Chairman, JK Tyre & Industries Ltd.
- Chairman, JK Lakshmi Cement Ltd.
- Chairman, Bengal & Assam Company Ltd.
- President, Governing Body, Lakshmipat Singhania Education Foundation.
- Chancellor, JK Lakshmipat University
- President, Governing Body, Lakshmipat Singhania Medical Foundation.
- Chairman, Population Foundation of India, a leading N.G.O. devoted to the cause of Population Stabilization (founded in 1970)
- President, Managing Committee, Pushpawati Singhania Research Institute for Liver, Renal & Digestive Diseases (PSRI), New Delhi.

Others

- President, International Chamber of Commerce (ICC), Paris, the world organisation of business (1993–1994) {the second Indian and third Asian to be the President of ICC}
- President, Federation of Indian Chambers of Commerce and Industry (FICCI) (1979–1980)
- Vice-president, Confederation of Asia-Pacific Chambers of Commerce and Industry (1982–1985)
- Member, Board of Trade of the Government of India (1989–1990)
- Director, Industrial Development Bank of India (IDBI) (1983–1989).
- Member, Board of Commonwealth Development Corporation, London. (1996–1999)
- Director, Atlas Copco AB (Swedish Company) and chairman, Atlas Copco (India) Ltd. (1996–2002)
- Member, Indo-French CEO Forum ( 1997–2011)
- Member, Indo-German Consultative Group (1996–1997)
- Member, Society, Governing Body and advisory board, Council of Scientific & Industrial Research (CSIR), Government of India (2002–2005)
- Chairman, Governing Board, Indian Institute of Management, Lucknow, for three consecutive terms of five years each (1992 – 2007– Total 15 years).
- Promoter Member, Governing Board, International Management Institute, India (IMI).
- Co-chairman, Indo-US Joint Business Council (1989–1991)
- Co-chairman, India-Japan Business Cooperation Committee (1982–1986)
- Co-chairman, Indo-Korea Joint Business Council (1986)
- Director, Shipping Corporation of India (1976 – 1977.)
- Director, The Oriental Fire & General Insurance Co. Limited (1977 – 1979.)
- Chairman, Development Council for Pulp, Paper and Allied Industries set up by the Government (1990–1991)
- Chairman, Joint Committee on Paper Industry.
- Member, Indian Council for Agricultural Research, Government of India (1991– 1994)
- Chairman, Indian Jute Mills Association (1967–1968)
- President, All India Organization of Employers (1972 -1974.)
- Director, Urban Mass Transit Co. Ltd. (1993–1996)
- Director, DCM Ltd. (1990–2001)
- Director, DCM Daewoo Ltd (Formally DCM Toyota Ltd) (1984–1997)
- And various other Indian/International Institutions and companies.

Appointed by Government of India to serve on various Committees from time to time.

== Awards ==
- Prestigious National Award "Padma Bhushan" in the year 2003 by the President of India, for his contribution in the field of trade and economic activities.
- In 2005 was awarded one of the highest Swedish Awards Royal Order of the Polar Star by the King of Sweden for his contribution to the development of Indo-Swedish business relations.
- "2008 Paper Industry International Hall of Fame Award" by the Paper Industry International Hall of Fame, Inc, United States.
- In 2010 received the "Lifetime Achievement Award for Asia Pacific entrepreneurship" from Enterprise Asia.
