= Gautam Singhania =

Indian businessman

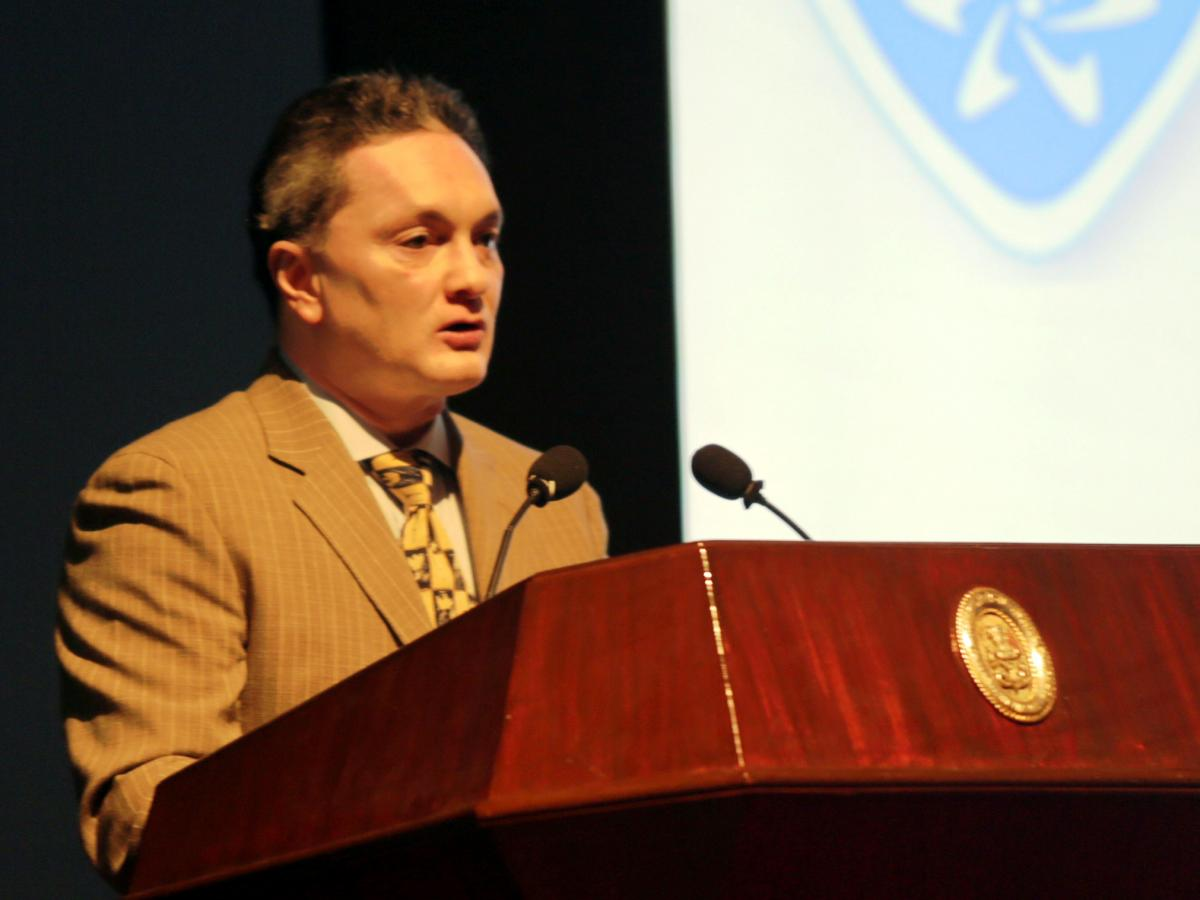
- Singhania in 2016
- Born: 9 September 1965 (age 61)
- Education: Cathedral and John Connon School; St. Mary's School, Mumbai
- Occupation: Industrialist
- Known for: Chairman and MD Raymond Group
- Spouse: Nawaz Modi Singhania (m. 1999; div. 2023)
- Children: 2
- Father: Vijaypat Singhania
- Website: twitter.com/SinghaniaGautam

Gautam Hari Singhania (born 9 September 1965) is an Indian billionaire industrialist. He is the chairman and managing director of the Raymond Group, the world's largest producer of suiting fabric.

== Early life ==
Gautam Singhania was born in a Marwari industrialist family, to Vijaypat Singhania.

He is an alumnus of St. Mary's School, Mumbai and Cathedral and John Connon School. He is also an alumnus of H.R. College in Churchgate, Mumbai.

== Career ==
Gautam Singhania joined the Singhania family's JK Group of companies in 1986. He later joined the family's Raymond Group, becoming a director in 1990, the managing director in July 1999, and the chairman in September 2000. He restructured the group and sold Raymond's non-core businesses (synthetics, steel and cement). Under him, the group moved its focus to fabrics, apparel brands, prophylactics (KamaSutra condoms), and men's toiletries. He has also focused on international partnerships for Raymond, including joint ventures with UCO Textiles of Belgium (denim) and Gruppo Zambaiti of Italy (shirting). In 2005, Singhania opened a nightclub named Poison in Bandra, with DJ Aqeel. As of 2012 Singhania's net worth is estimated to be around $1.4 billion.

In June 2024, shareholders approved the re‑appointment of Gautam Hari Singhania as Managing Director of Raymond Ltd for a fifth consecutive five‑year term, effective from 1 July 2024 .

Under his leadership, the Raymond Group underwent a strategic restructuring labeled "Raymond 2.0", involving demergers to create three distinct listed companies: Raymond Ltd (engineering), Raymond Lifestyle, and Raymond Realty. The real estate vertical was approved by the NCLT and listed in July 2025 .

In line with the new structure, Gautam Singhania has overseen the launch of Raymond Realty, which has reported ₹2,313 crore in revenue during fiscal 2025 with 45% year‑on‑year growth. He has publicly projected that the real estate business will double its topline to ₹4,000 crore (about 15% CAGR) over the next five years .

Singhania owns the yacht Ashena

== Speedboat accident in Maldives ==
In March 2026, Singhania's speedboat capsized off the coast of Maldives. Singhania survived with minor injuries and got himself treated at a hospital in Mumbai. There were seven people on the speedboat when the boat capsized near Felidhoo islands of the Maldives.

== Personal life ==
Gautam Singhania was married to Nawaz Modi Singhania, a Parsi. Nawaz is the daughter of solicitor Nadar Modi. The couple has two daughters named Niharika (born 10 December 2005) and Nisha. He divorced Nawaz in November 2023.

=== Family dispute ===
His father Vijaypat Singhania, the founder of the Raymond Group, has publicly accused his son, Gautam Singhania, of betraying him by taking over his 37% stake in 2015, forcing him out of his home in the 36-storey J.K. House, and making him destitute. The feud, characterized by bitter legal battles, has seen long-standing strained relations, with attempts at reconciliation denied by Vijaypat.

In March 2024, Vijaypat clarified that a photo shared by Gautam suggesting they had patched up was taken under false pretenses, and he denied any reconciliation, according to Business Standard.

He has suffered from vitiligo since a young age. Its progression accelerated when he was in his early 30s, as a side effect of medication.
