= List of people from Rome =

This is a list of notable people who were born, lived or are/were famously associated with Rome, Italy.

== A ==
- Daniel Acon
- Paul Adam
- Pope Adeodatus I
- Giorgio Agamben
- Pope Agapetus I
- Andrea Aiuti
- Paolo Alatri
- Gian Francesco Albani
- Giuseppe Albani
- Vincenzo Albrici
- Pietro Aldobrandini
- Alessandro Alessandroni
- Alexius of Rome
- Alfonso, Duke of Anjou and Cádiz
- Infante Alfonso of Spain
- Domenico Allegri
- Gregorio Allegri
- Agnese Allegrini
- Enrico Alleva
- Ilaria Alpi
- Giovanna Amati
- Maurizio Amati
- Claudio Amendola
- Giorgio Amendola
- Niccolò Ammaniti
- Franco Amurri
- Pope Anastasius IV
- Benjamin ben Abraham Anaw
- Zedekiah ben Abraham Anaw
- Giulio Andreotti
- Lucilla Andreucci
- Felice Anerio
- Giovanni Francesco Anerio
- Marco Angeletti
- Filippo d'Angeli
- Roberta Angelilli
- Fiorenzo Angelini
- Ambra Angiolini
- Luca Antei
- Richard Antinucci
- Silvio Antoniano
- Mark Antony
- Guillaume Apollinaire
- Alberto Aquilani
- Tullia d'Aragona
- Daniele Archibugi
- Francesca Archibugi
- Giulia Arcioni
- Maurizio Arena
- Asia Argento
- Claudio Argento
- Dario Argento
- Carlo Armellini
- Francesco Arquati
- Giuditta Tavani Arquati
- Antonella Attili
- Corrado Augias
- Augustine of Canterbury
- Augustus
- Marcus Aurelius
- Umberto Avattaneo
- Carlo Aymonino

== B ==
=== Ba–Bm ===
- Samuele Bacchiocchi
- Marcello Bacciarelli
- Giovanni Baglione
- Jorge de Bagration
- Giuseppe Baini
- Andrea Bajani
- Renato Baldini
- Silvia Baraldini
- Luca Barbarossa
- Anton Giuseppe Barbazza
- Antonio Barberini
- Urbano Barberini
- Enzo Barboni
- Paolo Barelli
- Andrea Bargnani
- Filippo Barigioni
- Gianfranco Barra
- Steve Bastoni
- Stefano di Battista
- Stefano Battistelli
- Lamberto Bava
- Marco Belladonna
- Dario Bellezza
- Giuseppe Gioachino Belli
- Francesco Bellissimo
- Alessandra Belloni
- Claudio Bellucci
- Pope Benedict V
- Marco Benefial
- Valerio Bernabò
- Antonino Bernardini
- Laura Bernasconi
- Luciano Bernasconi
- Ernesto Bertarelli
- Franca Bettoia
- Max Biaggi
- Laura Biagiotti
- Alessandro Bianchi
- Andrea Bianchi
- Daniela Bianchi
- Giorgio Bianchi
- Orazio Bianchi
- Angela Bianchini
- Paola Binetti
- Giovanni Bisignani
- Alessandro Blasetti
- Ilary Blasi

=== Bn–Bz ===
- Salvatore Boccaccio
- Tanio Boccia
- Alessandro Boccolini
- Camillo Boito
- Paolo Bonacelli
- Massimo Bonanni
- Lucien Louis Joseph Napoleon Bonaparte
- Pierre Napoleon Bonaparte
- Carla Boni
- Pope Boniface III
- Joseph Bonomi the Elder
- Camillo Borghese, 6th Prince of Sulmona
- Francesco Scipione Maria Borghese
- Junio Valerio Borghese
- Marcantonio Borghese, 5th Prince of Sulmona
- Scipione Borghese
- Cesare Borgia
- Giovanni Borgia
- Orazio Borgianni
- Mariacarla Boscono
- Giuseppe Bottai
- Raoul Bova
- Angelica Bove
- Jole Bovio Marconi
- Cesare Bovo
- Pietro Bracci
- Anna Laura Braghetti
- Pierre Savorgnan de Brazza
- Mario Brega
- Alfonso Brescia
- Oscar Brevi
- Lilla Brignone
- Andrea Briotti
- Alex Britti
- Riccardo Brosco
- Constantino Brumidi
- Cristian Bucchi
- Lorenzo Bucchi
- Marianna Bulgarelli
- Ernesto Buonaiuti
- Margherita Buy
- Guido Buzzelli

== C ==
=== Ca–Cm ===
- Nicola Cabibbo
- Giulio Caccini
- Julius Caesar
- Leone Caetani
- Mario Caiano
- Giulio Calì
- Mario Camerini
- Bernardino Cametti
- Princess Camilla, Duchess of Castro
- Achille Campanile
- Vincenzo Camuccini
- Giuseppe Canale
- Matteo Cancellieri
- Antonio Candreva
- Giovanni Angelo Canini
- Pompeo Cannicciari
- Federico Capasso
- Daniele Capezzone
- Gaetano Capocci
- Cristiana Capotondi
- Kaspar Capparoni
- Antonella Capriotti
- Andrea Carandini
- Francesco Carbone
- Lianella Carell
- Fabio Caressa
- Alberto Carlieri
- Vito Carnevali
- Angelo Caroselli
- Mario Carotenuto
- Memmo Carotenuto
- Stefano Caruso
- Giovanni Battista Casali
- Sandro Casamonica
- Mario Caserini
- Carlo Cassola
- Francesco Castellacci
- Enzo G. Castellari
- Pietro Castelli
- Claudio Castellini
- Sergio Castellitto
- Emilio de' Cavalieri
- Giacomo Cavalieri
- Simona Cavallari
- Pietro Cavallini
- Victor Cavallo
- Suso Cecchi d'Amico
- Rosalinda Celentano
- Pope Celestine I
- Gaspare Celio
- Rodolfo Celletti
- Beatrice Cenci
- Giuseppe Ceracchi
- Michelangelo Cerquozzi
- Michelangelo Cerruti
- Enzo Cerusico
- Valentina Cervi
- Giuseppe Cesari
- Federico Cesi
- Flavio Chigi
- Giuseppe Ciancabilla
- Fabrizio Cicchitto
- Luigi Cimara
- Flavio Cipolla
- Chiara Civello
- Donna Marina Torlonia di Civitella-Cesi
- Pope Clement X
- Muzio Clementi

=== Cn–Cz ===
- Filippo Coarelli
- Armando Colafrancesco
- Stefano Colantuono
- Veniero Colasanti
- Lelio Colista
- Giuseppe Colizzi
- Michael Collins
- Eugenio Colombo
- Paola Colonna
- Pompeo Colonna
- Francesca Comencini
- Emanuele Concetti
- Ercole Consalvi
- Bernardo Consorti
- Sandro Continenza
- Stefano Coppa
- Manuel Coppola
- Bruno Corbucci
- Sergio Corbucci
- Giovanni Corbyons
- Scipio Africanus
- Aemilia Tertia
- Lucius Cornelius Scipio
- Renato Corsetti
- Simone Corsi
- Giovanni Costa
- Antonella Costa
- Placido Costanzi
- Maurizio Costanzo
- Emanuele Crialese
- Simone Cristicchi
- Princess Cristina of Bourbon-Two Sicilies
- Paola Croce
- Lorella Cuccarini
- Gianluca Curci

== D ==
- Massimo D'Alema
- Dominic D'Alessandro
- Marco D'Alessandro
- Joe D'Amato
- Paolo Damiani
- Ilaria D'Amico
- Francesca Dani
- Daniel ben Judah
- Damiano David
- Augusto De Angelis
- Elio de Angelis
- Guido & Maurizio De Angelis
- Victoria De Angelis
- Andrea de Cesaris
- Filippo De Grassi
- Francesco De Gregori
- Aurelio De Laurentiis
- Giada De Laurentiis
- Veronica De Laurentiis
- Sylvio de Lellis
- Giuseppe De Luca
- Enrico De Pedis
- Daniele De Rossi
- Giovanni Battista de Rossi
- Mattia de Rossi
- Maurizio De Santis
- Lorenzo De Silvestri
- Giancarlo De Sisti
- Claudio De Sousa
- Daniele De Vezze
- Raffaele De Vita
- Emiliano Dei
- Lorenzo Del Prete
- Claudio Della Penna
- Pietro Della Valle
- Tonino Delli Colli
- Gabriele Dell'Otto
- Augusto De Marsanich
- Agostino Di Bartolomei
- Luigi Di Biagio
- Paolo Di Canio
- Valerio Di Cesare
- Nello Di Costanzo
- Angelo Di Livio
- Carlo Di Palma
- Alessio di Savino
- Marco Di Vaio
- Andrea Di Vito
- Silvia Dionisio
- Domitian
- Maurizio Domizzi
- Sergio Donati
- Cristiano Doni
- Mario Draghi
- Serafino Dubois
- Francesco Borgongini Duca
- Alessandro Duranti

== E ==
- Elio Germano
- Eduard Ender
- Guglielmo Epifani
- Franco Evangelisti
- Julius Evola

== F ==
- Enrico Fabbro
- Quintus Fabius Maximus Verrucosus
- Aldo Fabrizi
- Michel Fabrizio
- Federica Faiella
- Stefano Fanucci
- Felice Farina
- Prospero Farinacci
- Alexander Farnese, Duke of Parma
- Odoardo Farnese
- Pier Luigi Farnese, Duke of Parma
- Ada Feinberg-Sireni
- Fortunato Felice
- Pope Felix I
- Prince Ferdinand Pius, Duke of Calabria
- Sabrina Ferilli
- Enrico Fermi
- Giuliano Ferrara
- Ettore Ferrari
- Attilio Ferraris
- Anna Maria Ferrero
- Ciro Ferri
- Gabriella Ferri
- Luca Ferri
- Gabriele Ferzetti
- Domenico Fetti
- Franca Fiacconi
- Michael Fiaschetti
- Alessia Filippi
- Bruno Finesi
- Roberto Fiore
- Valerio Fiori
- Maturino da Firenze
- Fabio Firmani
- Giancarlo Fisichella
- Lucius Caesetius Flavus
- Alessandro Florenzi
- Marco Follini
- Marcello Fondato
- Eleonora Fonseca Pimentel
- Francesco Fonte
- Pope Formosus
- Cesare Francalancia
- Frances of Rome
- Daniele Franceschini
- Franco Frasi
- Franco Fraticelli
- Franco Frattini
- Giovanni Frattini
- Gianluca Freddi
- Giammarco Frezza
- Giorgio Frezzolini
- Princess Ira von Fürstenberg
- Massimiliano Fuksas
- Lucio Fulci
- Pietro Fumasoni Biondi
- Marcia Furnilla

== G ==
- Giulio Gabrielli the Younger
- Riccardo Galeazzi-Lisi
- Anna Galiena
- Maria Monaci Gallenga
- Pietro Luigi Galletti
- Daniele Galloppa
- Giuseppe Garibaldi
- Carlo Giorgio Garofalo
- Matteo Garrone
- Riccardo Garrone
- Alessandro Gassman
- Luciano Gaucci
- Giuliano Gemma
- Augusto Genina
- Enrico Gennari
- Giuseppe Gentile
- Artemisia Gentileschi
- Aloysius Gentili
- Paolo Gentiloni
- Claudia Gerini
- Gerino Gerini
- Publius Septimius Geta
- Riccardo Ghedin
- Massimo Ghini
- Andrea Ghiurghi
- Tata Giacobetti
- Dante Giacosa
- Adriano Giannini
- Giuseppe Giannini
- Maurizio Giglio
- Enrico Gilardi
- Giles of Rome
- Cristiano Gimelli
- Ludovico Gimignani
- Caterina Ginnasi
- Alberto Giolitti
- Pierluigi Giombini
- Bruno Giordano
- Domiziana Giordano
- Eleonora Giorgi
- Miriam Giovanelli
- Giovanna of Italy
- Italo Gismondi
- Giuseppe Giulietti
- Ignazio Giunti
- Leda Gloria
- Francesco Golisano
- Gonzalo, Duke of Aquitaine
- Carlo Grano
- Ugo Grappasonni
- Francesca Gregorini
- Pope Gregory I
- Fabio Grossi
- Romolo Guerrieri
- Monica Guerritore
- Vittorio Gui
- Umberto Guidoni
- Gaspar de Guzmán, Count-Duke of Olivares
- Corrado Guzzanti
- Paolo Guzzanti
- Sabina Guzzanti

== H ==
- Hadrian
- Ottone Hamerani
- Constantin Hansen
- Vanessa Hessler
- Paolo Heusch
- Pope Honorius IV
- Pope Honorius III
- Honorius of Canterbury
- Danny Huston

== I ==
- Emanuele Idini
- Immanuel the Roman
- Fiorella Infascelli
- Stefano Infessura
- Pope Innocent II
- Pope Innocent X
- Franco Interlenghi

== J ==
- Giuseppe Jannaconi
- Pope John XIX
- Pope John III
- John the Deacon of the Lateran
- Romina Johnson
- Renato William Jones
- Jovanotti
- Juan Carlos I of Spain
- Pope Julius I
- Pope Julius III
- Justus

== K ==
- Shahrum Kashani
- Tony Kendall
- Claudia Koll
- Sylva Koscina
- Fiorella Kostoris
- Ciril Kotnik

== L ==
- Silvio Lafuenti
- Rodolfo Lanciani
- Stefano Landi
- Lapo da Castiglionchio
- Umberto Massimo Lattuca
- Mariano Laurenti
- Filippo Lauri
- Flavio Lazzari
- Pietro Lazzari
- Stefano Lentini
- Sergio Leone
- Carlo Leoni
- Ottavio Leoni
- Neva Leoni
- Giulio Liberati
- Luca Lionello
- Artus de Lionne
- Fabio Liverani
- Barbara Livi
- Carlo Lizzani
- Andrea Locatelli
- Giovanni Lombardo Radice
- Sophia Loren
- Claudio Lotito
- Ray Lovelock
- Rosetta Loy
- Gianni Hecht Lucari
- Franco Lucentini
- Daniele Luchetti
- Pope Lucius I
- Lucullus
- Marco Luly
- Diana Luna
- Amos Luzzatto

== M ==
=== Ma-Mn ===
- Ruggero Maccari
- Joel McHale
- Federico Macheda
- Francisco Macri
- Stefano Madia
- Raimundo de Madrazo y Garreta
- Federico de Madrazo
- Daniele Magliocchetti
- Tiziano Maggiolini
- Anna Magnani
- Teoberto Maler
- Franco Maria Malfatti
- Hortense Mancini
- Marie Mancini
- Olympia Mancini
- Francesco Mander
- Silvana Mangano
- Fiorella Mannoia
- Corrado Mantoni
- Faustina Maratti
- Vipsania Marcella
- Gaius Epidius Marcellus
- Francesco Marchetti Selvaggiani
- Carlo Marchionni
- Marco Marchionni
- Enrico Marconi
- Francesco Marconi
- Maria Marconi
- Tommaso Marconi
- Pope Mark
- Alessia Marcuzzi
- Infanta Margarita, 2nd Duchess of Hernani
- Antonio Margheriti
- Princess Maria Theresa of Löwenstein-Wertheim-Rosenberg
- Princess Marie Louise of Bourbon-Parma
- Giovanna Marini
- Tania di Mario
- Francesco Marmaggi
- Anton von Maron
- Therese Maron
- Marozia
- Piero Marrazzo
- Otello Martelli
- Pope Martin V
- Alessandra Martines
- Daniele Martinetti
- Alberto De Martino
- Sergio Martino
- Carl Marzani
- Francesco Maselli
- Giulietta Masina
- Lea Massari
- Camillo Massimo
- Chiara Mastalli
- Corrado Mastantuono
- Camillo Mastrocinque
- Ruggero Mastroianni
- Agostino Masucci
- Raffaello Matarazzo
- Bruno Mattei
- Leonardo Maugeri
- Girolama Mazzarini
- Gian Luca Mazzella
- Carlo Mazzone

=== Mb–Mz ===
- Melania the Younger
- Giordano Meloni
- Ricky Memphis
- Menahem ben Solomon
- Michele Mercati
- Adalberto Maria Merli
- Maurizio Merli
- Marisa Merlini
- Valeria Messalina
- Metastasio
- Fernando Mezzasoma
- Giovanna Mezzogiorno
- Martina Miceli
- Prince Michael of Greece and Denmark
- Maria Michi
- Alba Milana
- Dario Minieri
- Michelangelo Minieri
- Christian Minotti
- Dante Mircoli
- Eduardo Missoni
- Franco Modigliani
- Paolo Moffa
- Maurizio Molinari
- Antonio Monda
- Massimo Mongai
- Riccardo Morandi
- Elsa Morante
- Alberto Moravia
- Alessandro Morbidelli
- Emiliano Moretti
- Luigi Moretti
- Nanni Moretti
- Massimo Moriconi
- Gaetano Moroni
- Ennio Morricone
- Massimo Morsello
- Gabriele Muccino
- Silvio Muccino
- Luigi Musso
- Alessandra Mussolini
- Ornella Muti
- Roberto Muzzi

== N ==
- Moses Nagari
- Gianluca Nani
- Armando Nannuzzi
- Napoleone Orsini Frangipani
- Stefano Napoleoni
- Marco Napolioni
- Archimede Nardi
- Mauro Nardoni
- Nathan ben Jehiel
- Alessandro Nesta
- Margit Evelyn Newton
- Pope Nicholas III
- Bruno Nicolai
- Prince Nikolaos of Greece and Denmark
- John Nobili
- Carlo Nocella

== O ==
- Hugh O'Connor
- Carlo Odescalchi
- Cipriano Efisio Oppo
- Paolo Orano
- Alberto Orlando
- Fernando Orsi
- Giovanni Orsina
- Clarice Orsini
- Flavio Orsini
- Fulvio Orsini
- Alfredo Ottaviani

== P ==
=== Pa–Pm ===
- Lina Pagliughi
- Lola Pagnani
- Giuseppe Palica
- Anita Pallenberg
- Gabriella Pallotta
- Silvana Pampanini
- Benedetto Pamphili
- Alessandra Panaro
- Adriano Panatta
- Claudio Panatta
- Paolo Panelli
- Patrizia Panico
- Giancarlo Pantano
- Gabriele Paoletti
- Arvid Pardo
- Ryan Paris
- Giorgio Parisi
- Gianfranco Parolini
- Cesare Pascarella
- Giovanni Battista Passeri
- Giuseppe Passeri
- Pope Paul V
- Pierfrancesco Pavoni
- Quintus Pedius
- Mario Pei
- Pope Pelagius I
- Pope Pelagius II
- Giordano Pellegrino
- Federico Peluso
- Jacopo Peri
- Ivo Perilli
- Luigi Pernier
- Lucilla Perrotta
- Giampietro Perrulli
- Manolo Pestrin
- Elio Petri
- Cinzia Petrucci
- Marcello Piacentini
- Carlo delle Piane
- Pier Ruggero Piccio
- Luigi Pichler
- Pier Luigi Cherubino
- Enrico Pieranunzi
- Pietro da Pietri
- Tommaso Pincio
- Bartolomeo Pinelli
- Ezio Pinza
- Giampiero Pinzi
- Piotta
- Alessandro Piperno
- Francesco Piranesi
- Emanuele Pirro
- Marco Pisano

=== Pn–Pz ===
- Claudio Pistolesi
- Pope Pius XII
- Violante Placido
- Giampiero Pocetta
- Sylvia Poggioli
- Maurizio Ponzi
- Mario Ponzo
- Stefano Porcari
- Daniele Portanova
- Andrea Pozzi
- Stefano Pozzi
- Matteo Pratichetti
- Giancarlo Prete
- Armando Preti
- Giancarlo Primo
- Andrea Procaccini
- Gigi Proietti
- Alessandro Proni
- Giorgio Prosperi
- Giuseppe Puglia

== Q ==
- Daniele Quadrini
- Francesco Quinn
- Lorenzo Quinn
- Francesco Quintini

== R ==
- Danny Raco
- Giacomo Raffaelli
- Pietro Raimondi
- Carlo Rainaldi
- Girolamo Rainaldi
- Giovanna Ralli
- Eros Ramazzotti
- Gianluca Ramazzotti
- Dean Reed
- Piero Regnoli
- Ivanka Veronika Reja
- Arcangelo Resani
- Bianca Riario
- Giuseppe Ricciotti
- Cola di Rienzo
- Alessandro Rinaldi
- Giuseppe Rinaldi
- Matteo Rizzo
- Giovanni Battista Rinuccini
- Albert Roccardi
- Ettore Roesler Franz
- Flavio Roma
- Luca Romagnoli
- Antoniazzo Romano
- Giovanni Cristoforo Romano
- Giulio Romano
- Judah ben Moses Romano
- Paolo Emilio Rondinini
- Aleandro Rosi
- Rosa Diletta Rossi
- Carlo Rosselli
- Ingrid Rossellini
- Isabella Rossellini
- Renzo Rossellini (composer)
- Renzo Rossellini (producer)
- Roberto Rossellini
- Kim Rossi Stuart
- Girolamo Rossi
- Luciano Rossi
- Giuseppe Rotunno
- Ludovico Rusconi Sassi
- Andrea Russotto
- Francesco Rutelli

== S ==
=== Sa–Sm ===
- Gigi Sabani
- Antonio Sabàto, Jr.
- Ashraf Saber
- Antonio Sacconi
- Luigi Sagrati
- Alessio Sakara
- Luciano Salce
- Tommaso Salini
- Sergio Salvati
- Nicola Salvi
- Sampson the Hospitable
- Rafael Sánchez Ferlosio
- Aitana Sánchez-Gijón
- Valeria Sannucci
- Maya Sansa
- Mara Santangelo
- Vincenzo Santopadre
- Daniela Sanzone
- Giulio Aristide Sartorio
- Giovanni Battista Savelli
- Mirko Savini
- Princess Mafalda of Savoy
- Maria Anna of Savoy
- Luciana Sbarbati
- Mattia Sbragia
- Franca Scagnetti
- Giovanni Battista Scaramelli
- Pietro Filippo Scarlatti
- Rudolph Schadow
- Giancarlo Schiaffini
- Elsa Schiaparelli
- Ernesto Screpanti
- Scribonia
- Ezio Sella
- Andy Selva
- Franco Sensi
- Rosella Sensi
- Michele Sepe
- Luigi Serafini
- Clara Sereni
- Michele Serra
- Alessio Sestu
- Pope Severinus
- Guido Ascanio Sforza di Santa Fiora
- Giovanni Sgambati
- Alessandro Sgrigna
- Enrico Sgrulletti
- Sabrina Siani
- Enzo Siciliano
- Eugenio Sicomoro
- Glauco Signorini
- Luis Simarro Lacabra
- Simcha of Rome
- Pope Sixtus I

=== Sn–Sz ===
- Danilo Soddimo
- Sergio Sollima
- Bobby Solo
- Cornelio Sommaruga
- Alberto Sordi
- Pietro Spada
- Alessandro Specchi
- Innocenzo Spinazzi
- Altiero Spinelli
- Luciano Spinosi
- Francesco Statuto
- Simonetta Stefanelli
- Giacomo Gaetani Stefaneschi
- Roberto Stellone
- Pope Stephen I
- Cesare Sterbini
- Michael Stern
- Raffaele Stern
- Giampietro Stocco
- Paolo Stoppa
- Vittorio Storaro
- Alessandro Stradella
- Charles Edward Stuart
- Henry Benedict Stuart

== T ==
- Fanny Tacchinardi Persiani
- Antonio Tajani
- Stefano Tamburini
- Domenico Tardini
- Mauro Tassotti
- Paola Taverna
- Marcus Terentius Varro Lucullus
- Christian Terlizzi
- Maurizio Thermes
- Camillo Tinti
- Simone Tiribocchi
- Tommaso Tittoni
- Titus
- Enrico Toccacelo
- Giorgia Todrani
- Maria Sole Tognazzi
- Gianni Togni
- Marilù Tolo
- Alessio Tombesi
- Tommyknocker
- Salvator Tongiorgi
- Giulio Tonti
- Cesare Torelli
- Alessandro Torlonia, 2nd Prince di Civitella-Cesi
- Augusto Torlonia, 3rd Prince di Civitella Cesi
- Giovanni Torlonia, 1st Prince di Civitella-Cesi
- Leopoldo Torlonia
- Barnaba Tortolini
- Enrico Toti
- Gianni Toti
- Francesco Totti
- Fausto Tozzi
- Trasilla and Emiliana
- Margarete Traube
- Leopoldo Trieste
- Trilussa
- Jasmine Trinca
- Licia Troisi
- Antonello Trombadori
- Alessandro Tulli
- Guido Turchi

== U ==
- Pope Urban VII

== V ==
- Giuseppe Valadier
- Giacomo Valentini
- Lorenzo Valla
- Bice Valori
- Carlo Vanzina
- Walter Veltroni
- Antonello Venditti
- Giovanni Francesco Venturini
- Carlo Verdone
- Renzo Vespignani
- Virginio Vespignani
- Giovanni Maria Vian
- Marco Vicario
- Uros Vico
- Pope Vigilius
- Claudio Villa
- Giulia Villoresi
- Vincent Pallotti
- Marcus Vinicius
- Valerio Virga
- Ennio Quirino Visconti
- Louis Visconti
- Milly Vitale
- Alvaro Vitali
- Mutio Vitelleschi
- Monica Vitti
- Gianluca Vivan
- Milena Vukotic

== W ==
- John William Waterhouse
- Lina Wertmüller

== Y ==
- Yiram of Magdiel

== Z ==
- Luigi Zampa
- Alessandro Zamperini
- Daniel Zampieri
- Lamberto Zauli
- Carlo Zecchi
- Pope Zephyrinus
- Federico Zeri
- Renato Zero
- Bruno Zevi

== See also ==
- List of Italians
- List of mayors of Rome
