= Boccolini =

Boccolini is a surname. Notable people with the surname include:

- Alfredo Boccolini (1885–1956), Italian actor
- Alessandro Boccolini (born 1984), Italian football (soccer) goalkeeper
- Laurence Boccolini (born 1963), French radio and television host

== See also ==
- Broccolini (surname)
