= Nardoni =

Nardoni is an Italian surname. Notable people with the surname include:

- Alexandre Nardoni (born 1978), Brazilian convicted murderer
- Juan Nardoni (born 2002), Argentine footballer
- Mauro Nardoni (born 1945), Italian footballer
- Christopher Nardoni (born 1923), noble and aristocrat
- Isabella Nardoni (born 2002), Brazilian murder victim
