= Tavani =

Tavani may refer to:

In people:

- Giuditta Tavani Arquati (1830–1867), an Italian republican patriot
- Domingo Maria Tavani (1919-1924), 109th Minister General of the Order of Friars Minor
- Frank Tavani, (b. 1935), an American football coach and former player

In places:

- Tavani, Nunavut, uninhabited mining camp and later trading post in Canada
- Tavani-ye Shomareh-ye Haft, a village in Iran
