= Maggiolini =

Maggiolini is an Italian surname. Notable people with the surname include:

- Alessandro Maggiolini (1931–2008), Italian Roman Catholic bishop
- Giuseppe Maggiolini (1738–1814), Italian woodworker
- Stefanía Maggiolini (born 1986), Uruguayan footballer
- Tiziano Maggiolini (born 1980), Italian footballer
