= Frasi =

Frasi is an Italian surname. Notable people with the surname include:

- Franco Frasi (1928–2009), Italian footballer
- Giulia Frasi (c. 1730–c.1772), Italian opera singer
