= Anna Risi =

Italian painting model. Muse and mistress of German painter Anselm Feuerbach

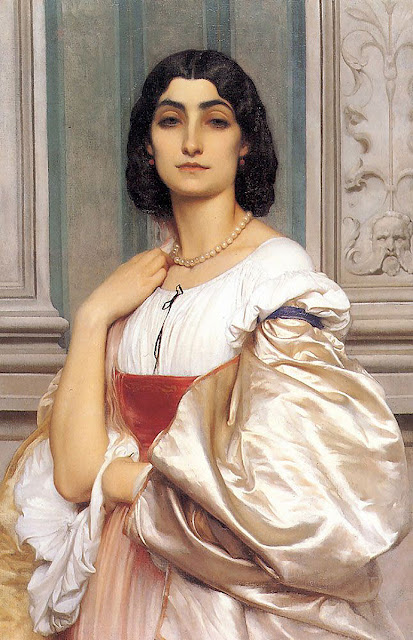
- Portrait of Risi by Frederic Leighton
- Born: 14 July 1839; Genzano di Roma, Papal States
- Died: 18 May 1900 (aged 60); Rome, Kingdom of Italy
- Occupation: Art model
- Era: Aestheticism
- Known for: Popular model for paintings
- Partner: Anselm Feuerbach

Anna Risi (14 July 1839 – 18 May 1900), nicknamed Nanna, was a popular Italian art model. She was a muse and mistress of German painter Anselm Feuerbach, who admired her beauty so much that he painted her at least twenty times.

== Biography ==
Risi was married to a cobbler and lived in Trastevere, a village neighborhood in Rome with a history as working class. Her striking features caught the eye of various artists who came to the city for inspiration, and she modeled for a number of paintings and sculptures in her early 20s. But it wasn't until Frederic Leighton, who would become the President of the Royal Academy in London, that her face became known to the world. Leighton's series of paintings of Risi caught the eye of the Prince of Wales and other notables, canonizing her forever.

From there, Risi became the obsession of Anselm Feuerbach, who painted dozens of paintings of his muse and lover. By then, Risi had left her family and was living with the artist. Feuerbach and his family did much to improve Risi's circumstances and style, but the artist was irritable and suffered from syphilis. Risi ran off with a "rich Englishman", only to return to Feuerbach and beg him forgiveness. He had a new muse at that time, so he rejected her. He wrote: "Yesterday her predecessor accosted me in greatly reduced circumstances", "But I merely waved to her from a distance".

Today, Feuerbach's works of Risi are housed in Wiesbaden, Germany.

== Gallery ==
=== Painting ===
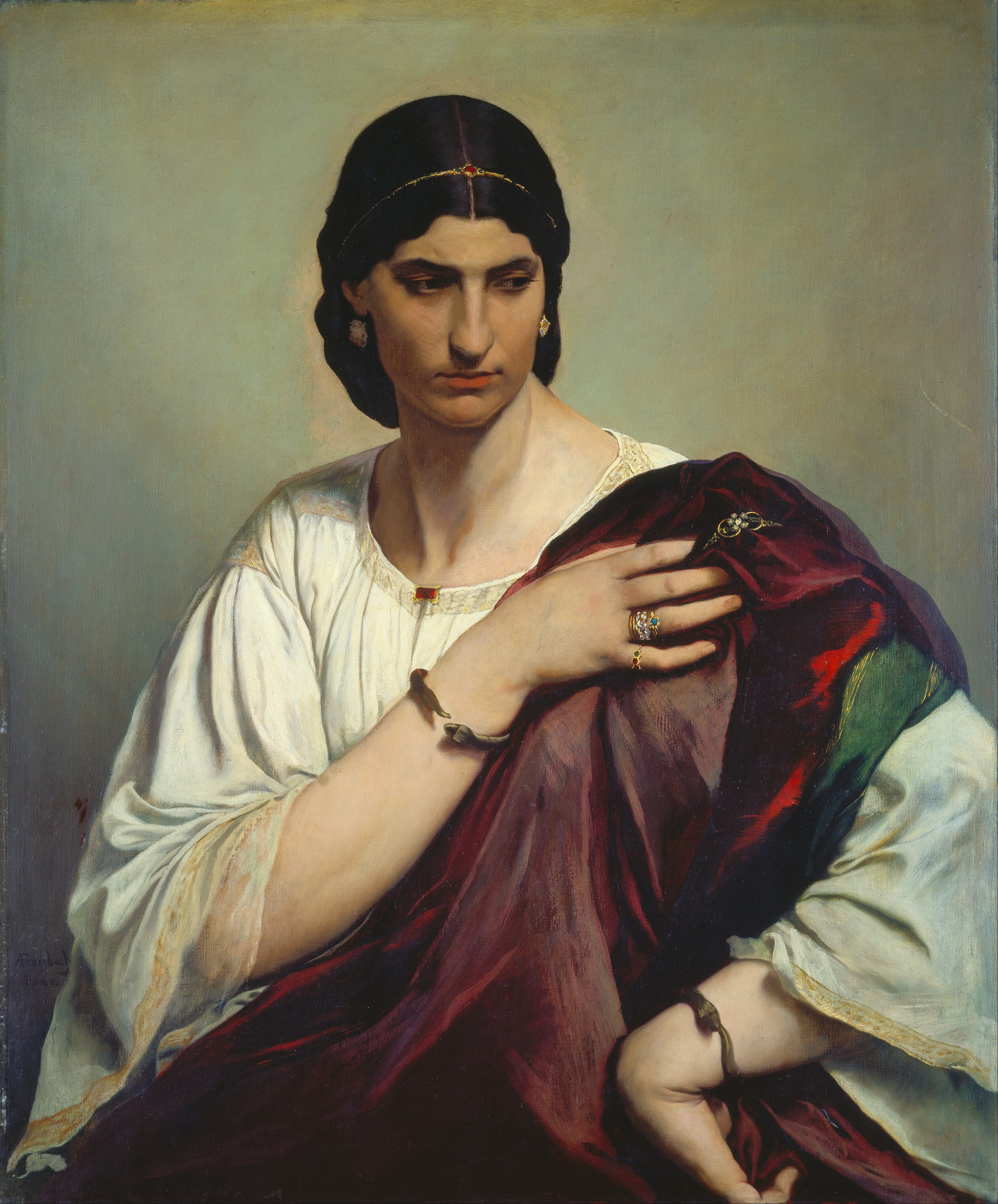
Risi depicted as Vipsania in Eine Römerin (A Roman Woman) by Feuerbach

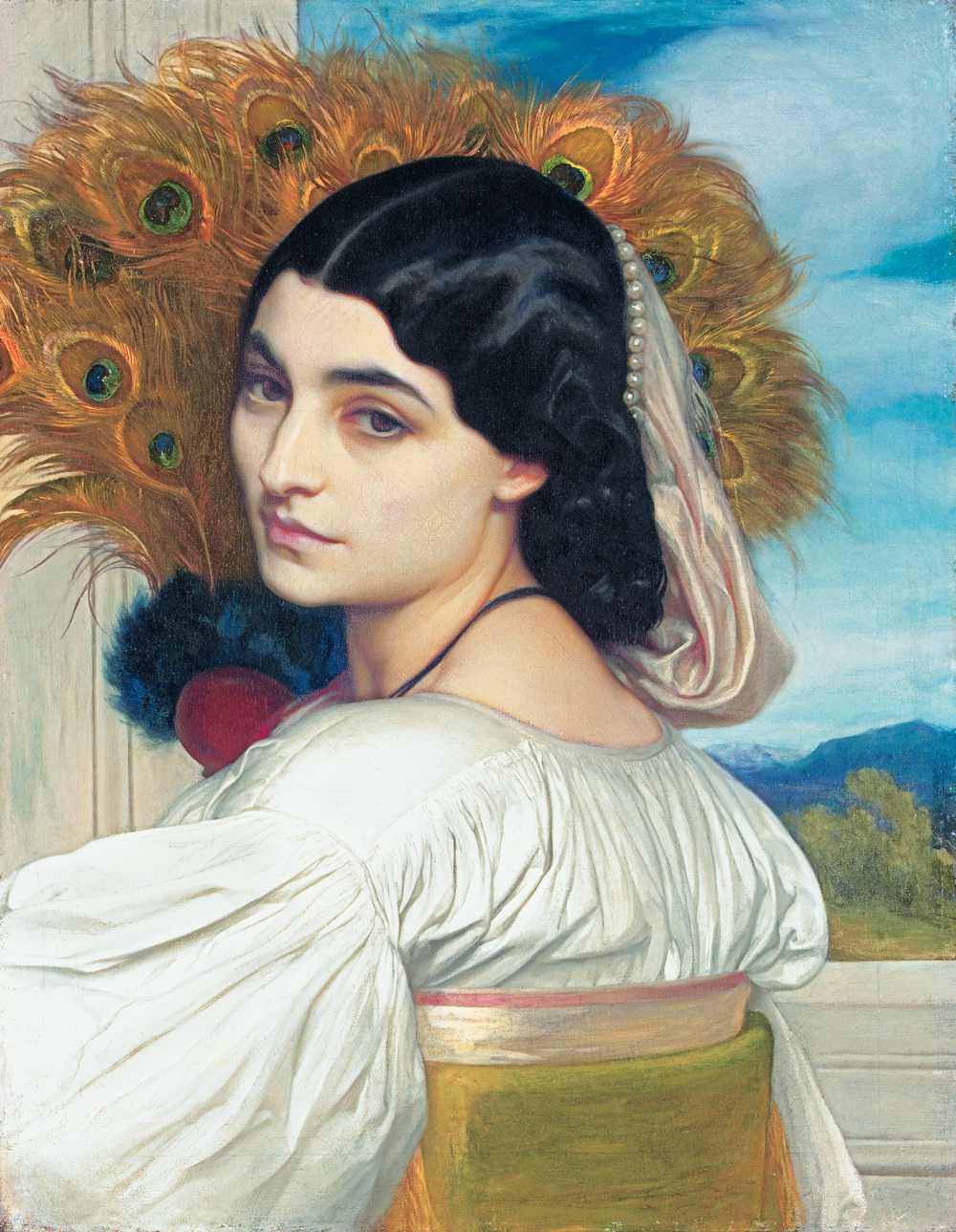
Risi as Pavonia in Pavonia by Leighton

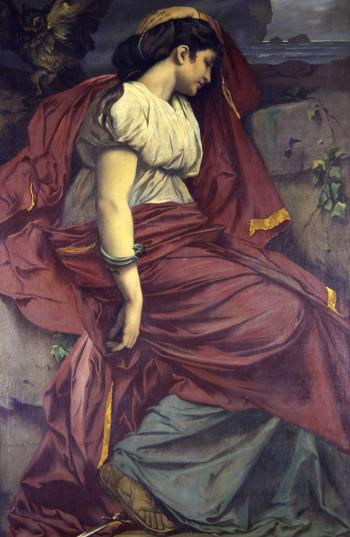
Risi as Medea in Medea mit dem Dolch (Medea with the Dagger) by Feuerbach

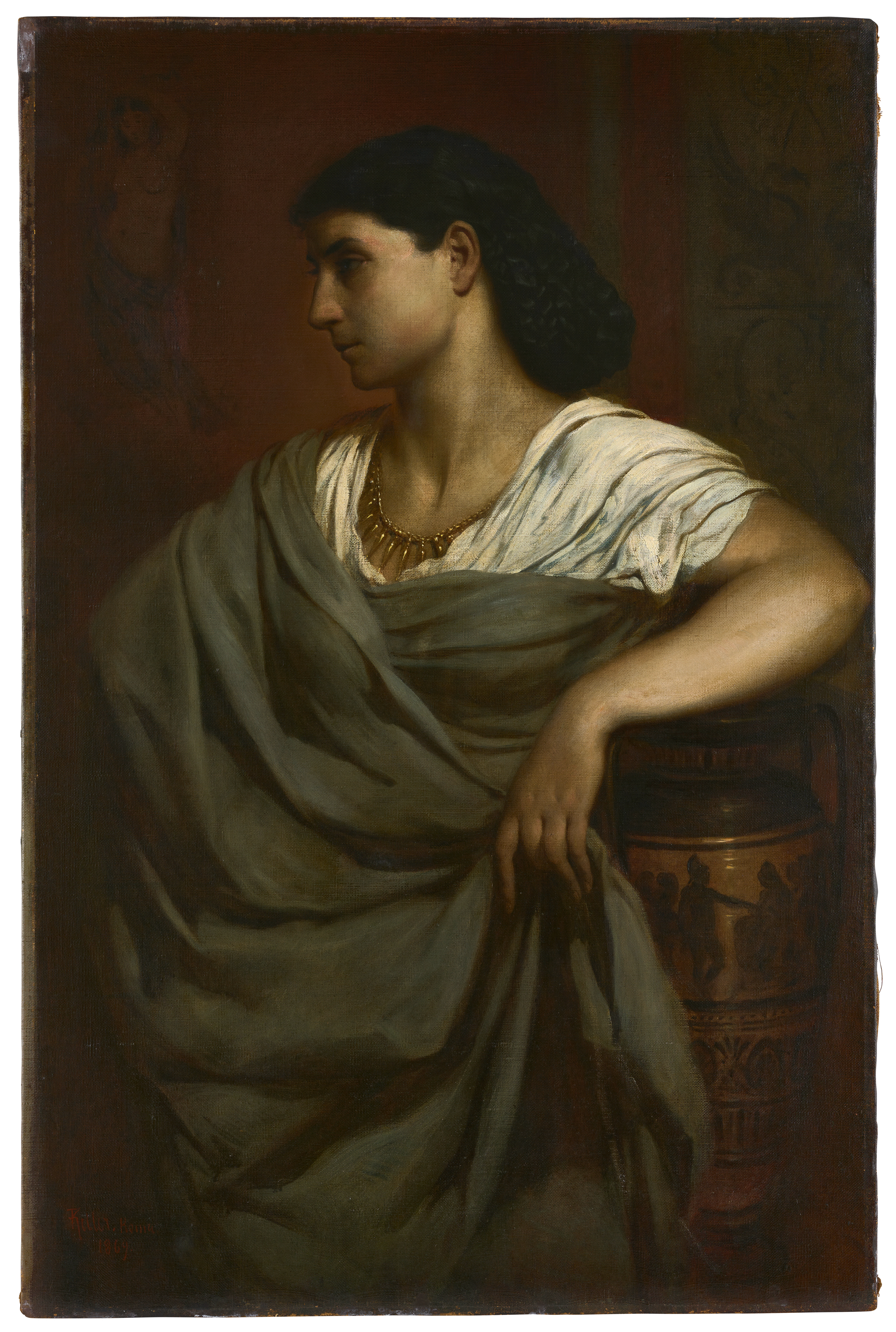
Risi as herself in Bildnis Nanna Risi (Portrait of Nanna Risi) by Ferdinand Keller

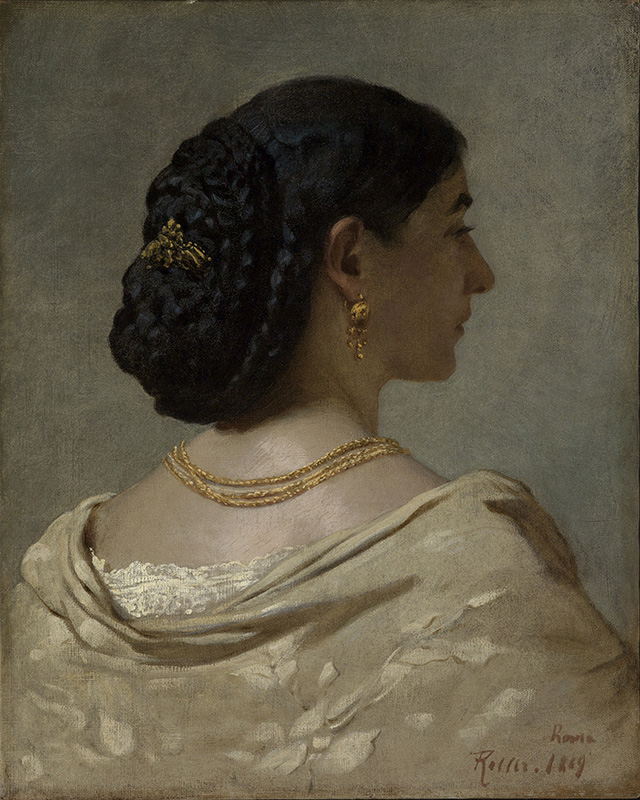
Ferdinand Keller

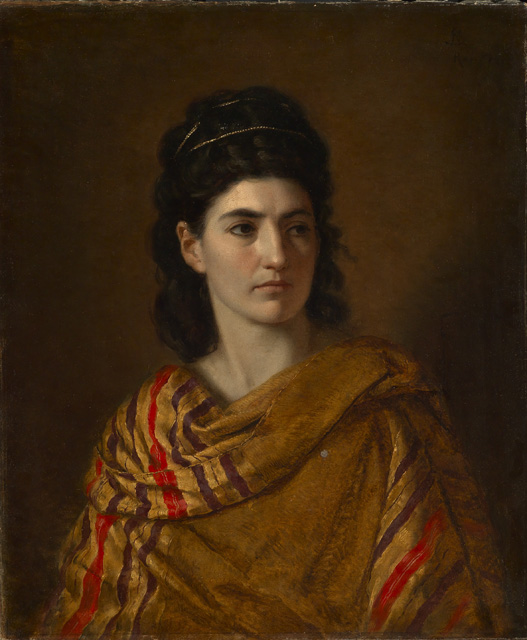
Nathanael Schmitt

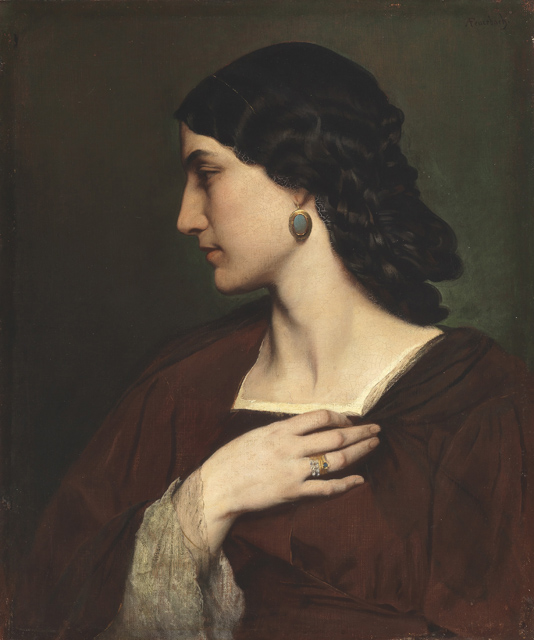
Anselm Feuerbach

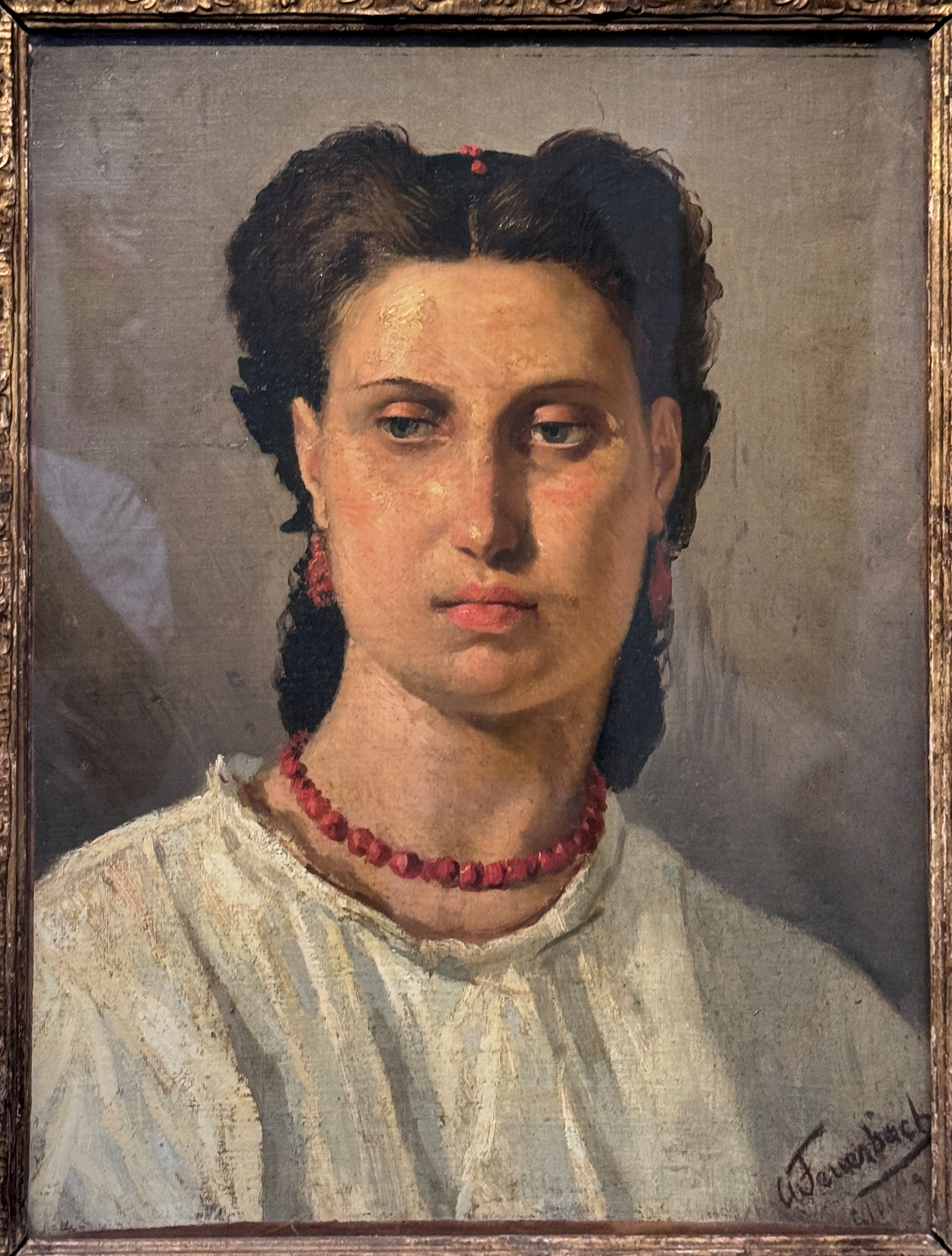
Anselm Feuerbach

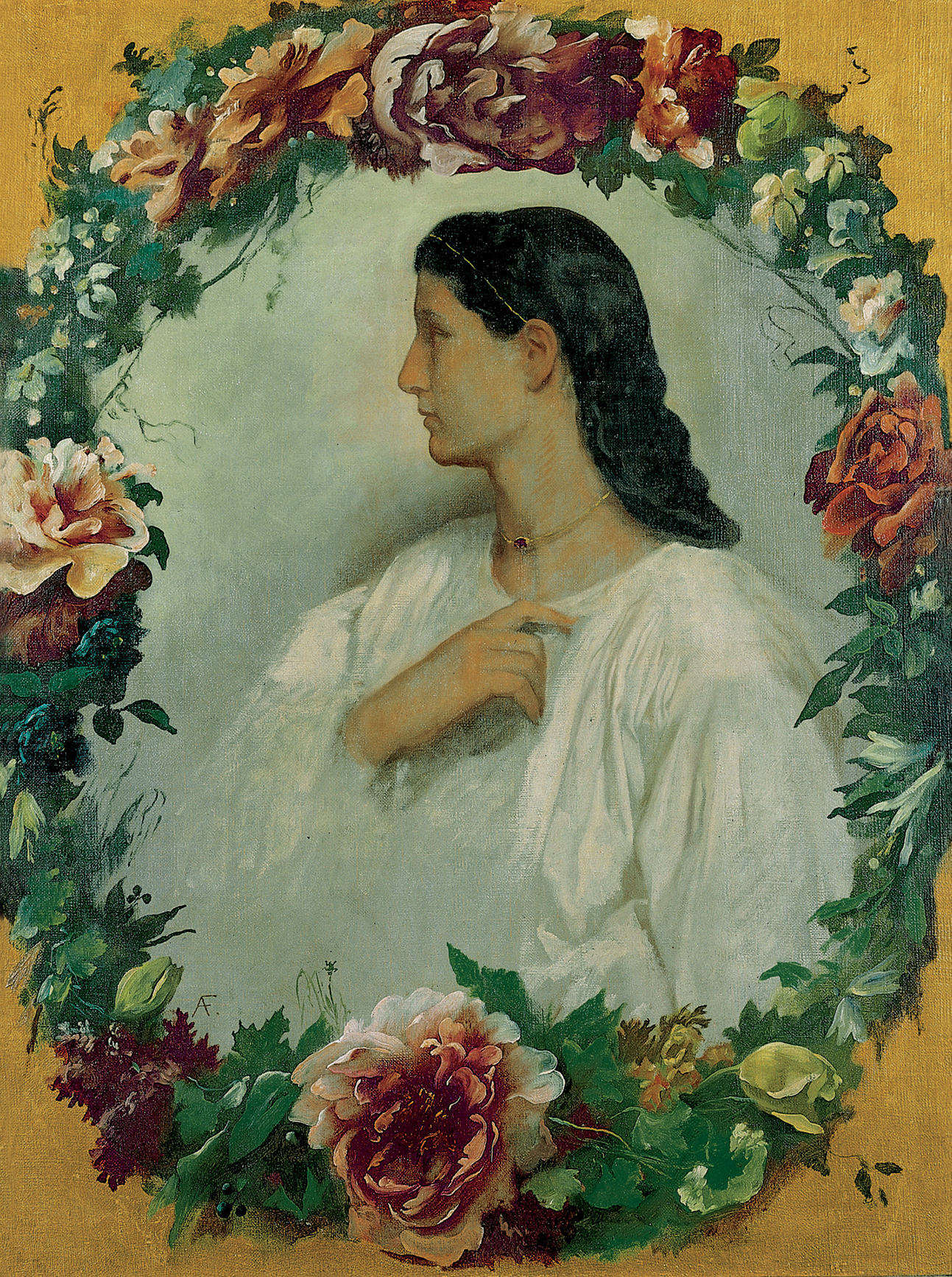
Anselm Feuerbach

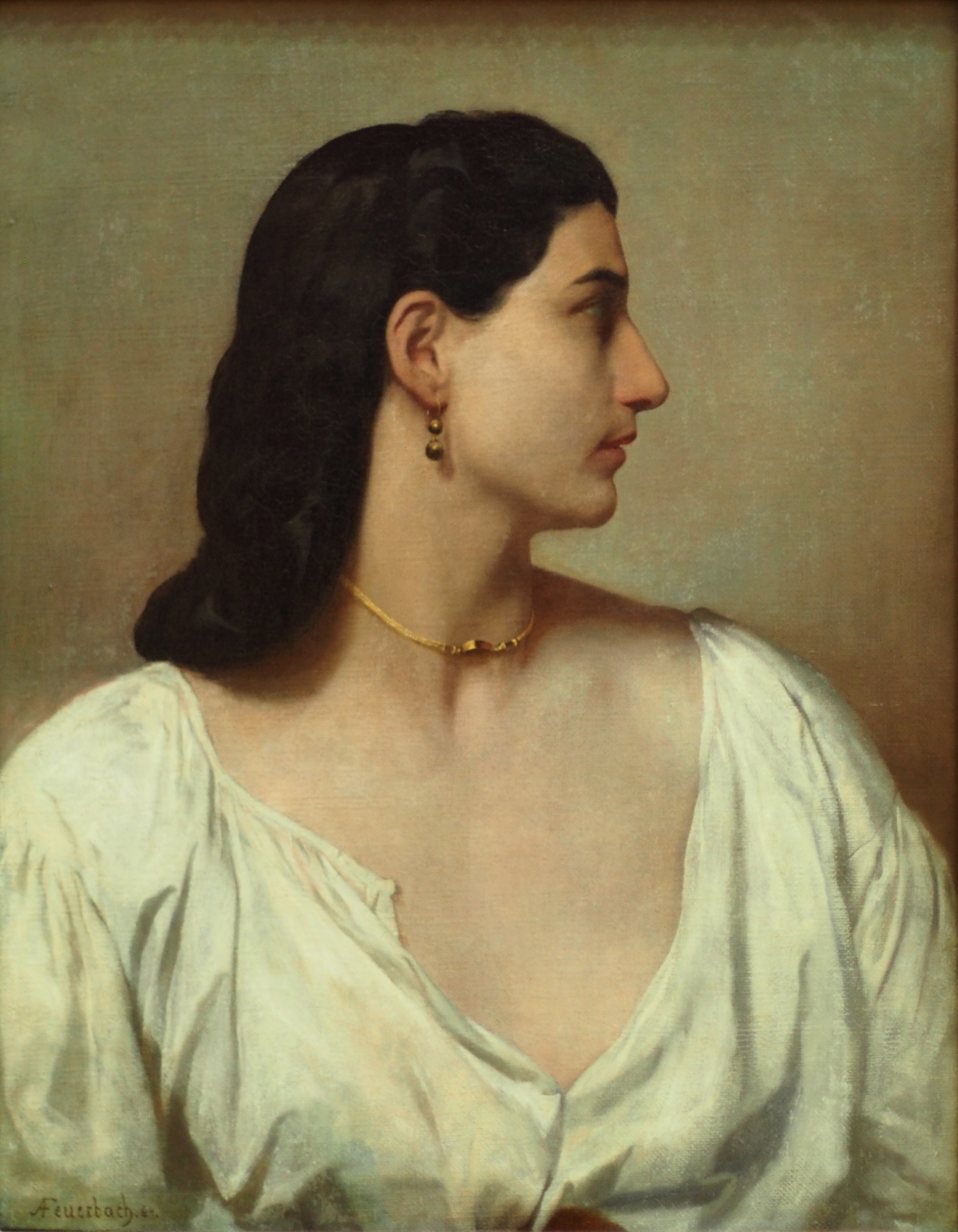
Anselm Feuerbach

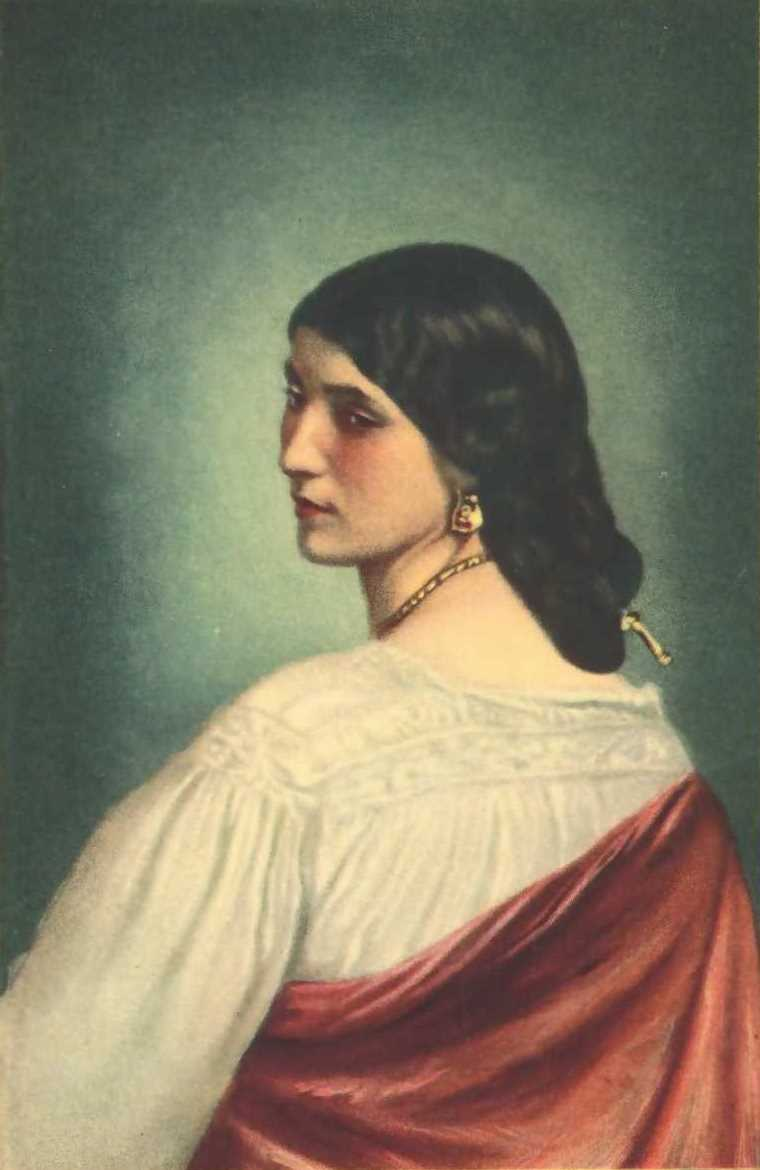
Anselm Feuerbach

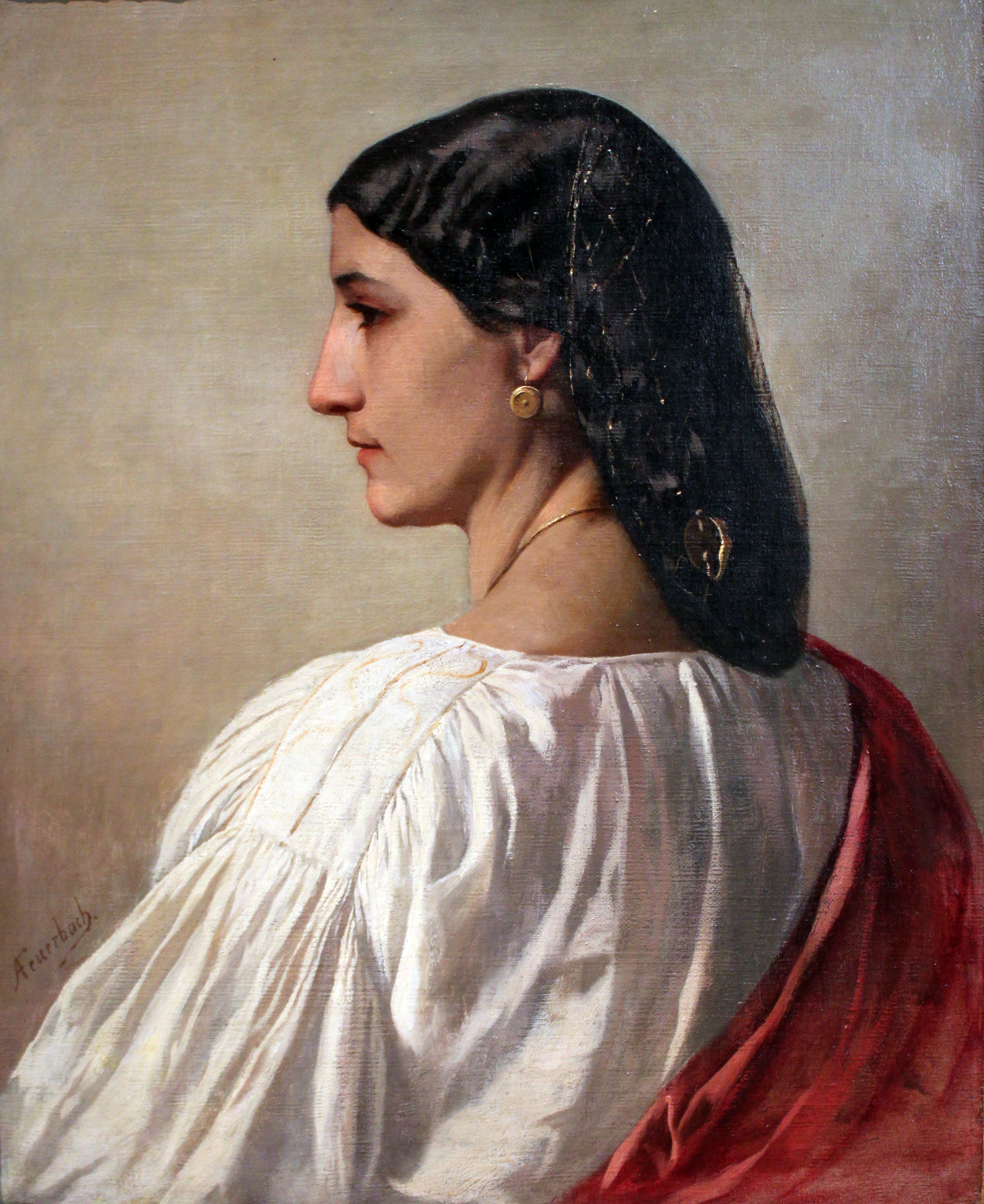
Anselm Feuerbach

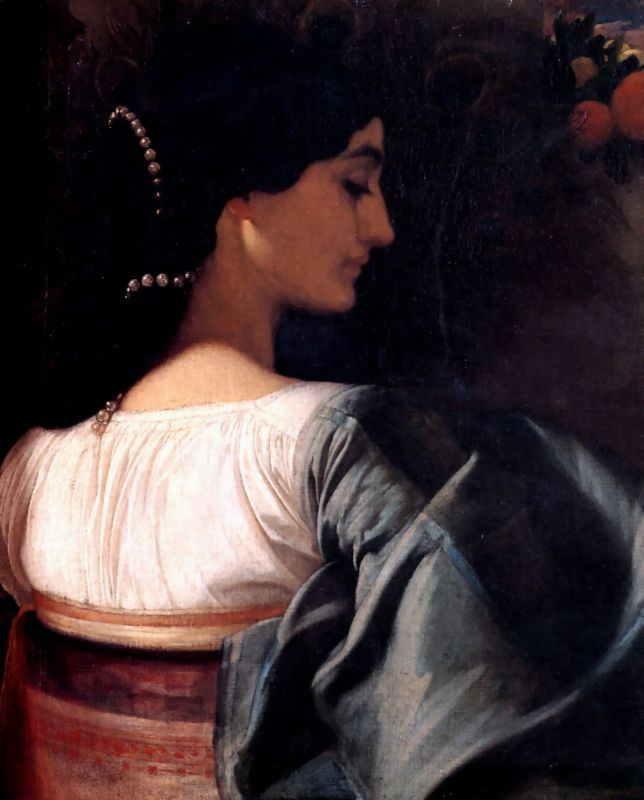
Frederick Leighton

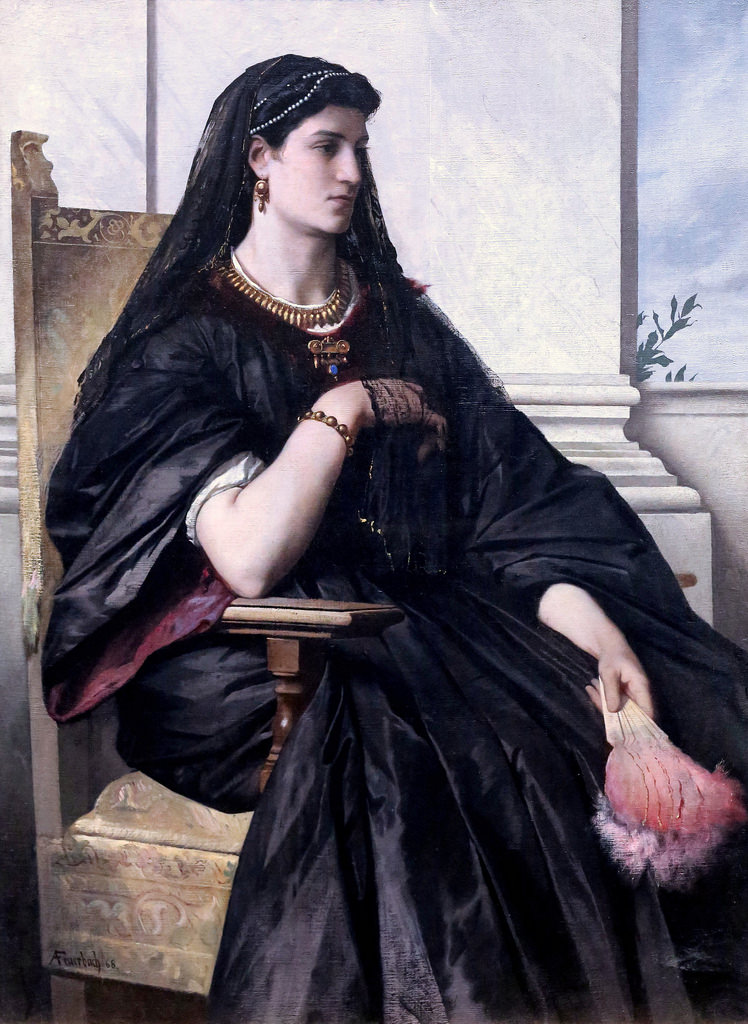
Anselm Feuerbach

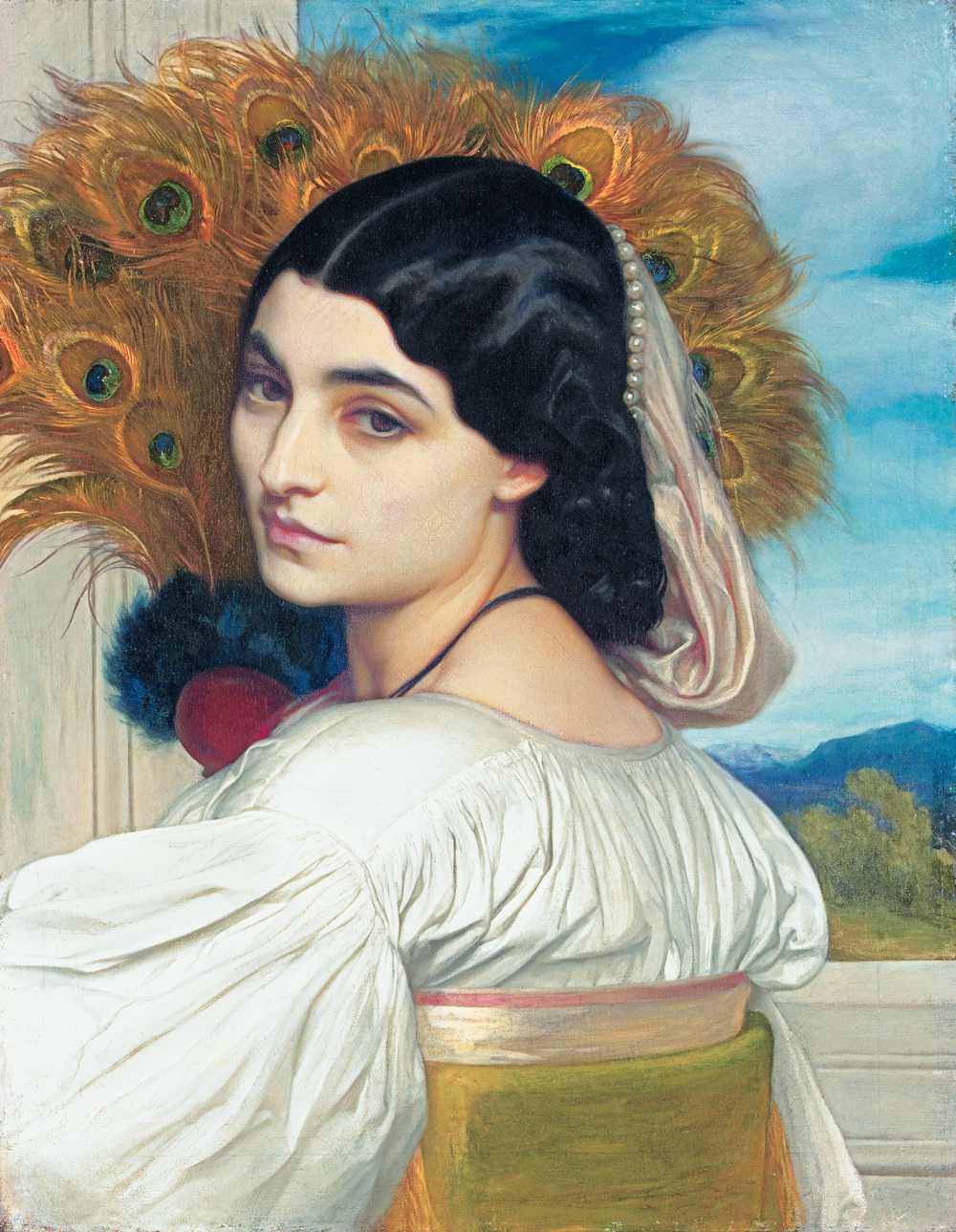
Frederick Leighton

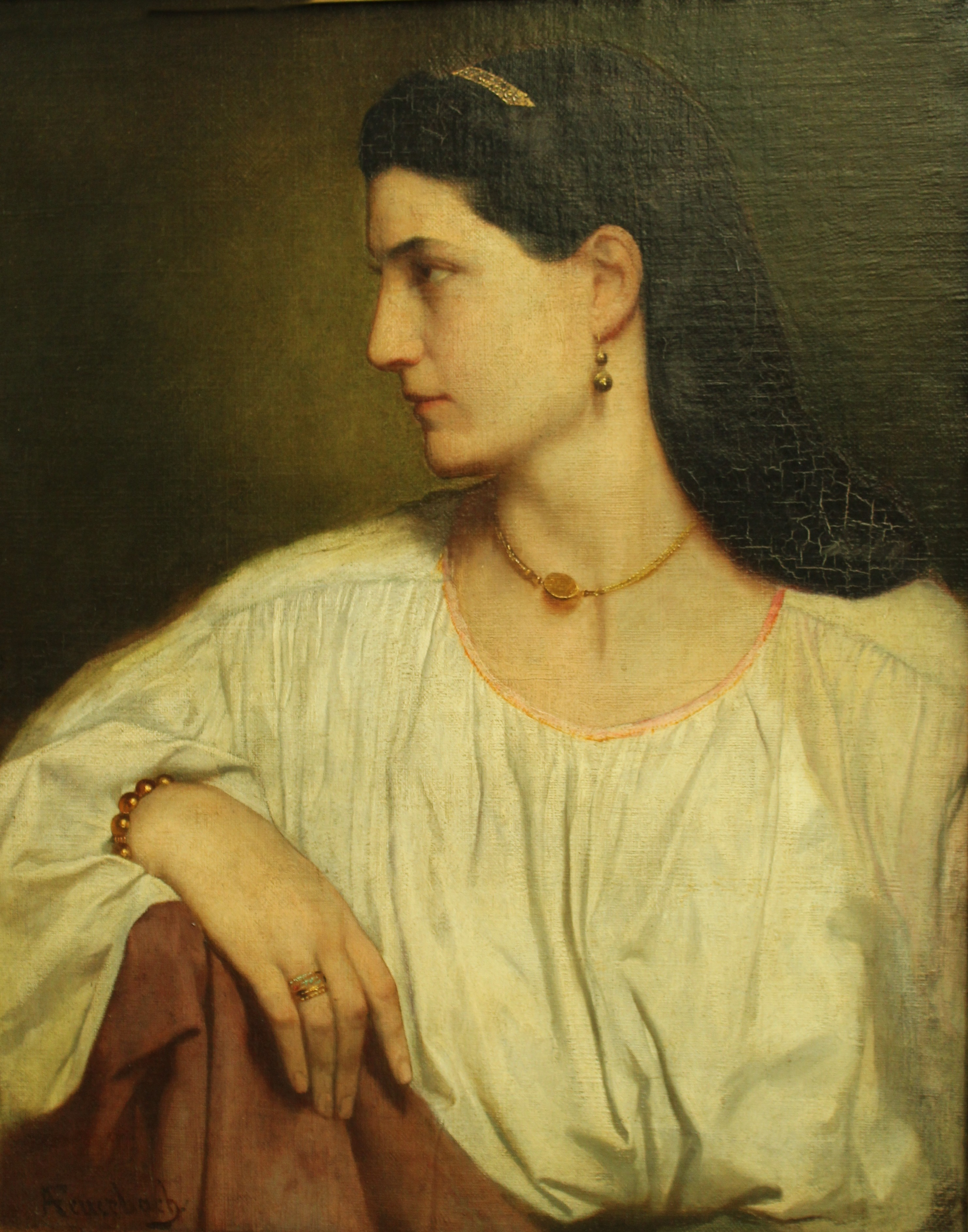
Anselm Feuerbach

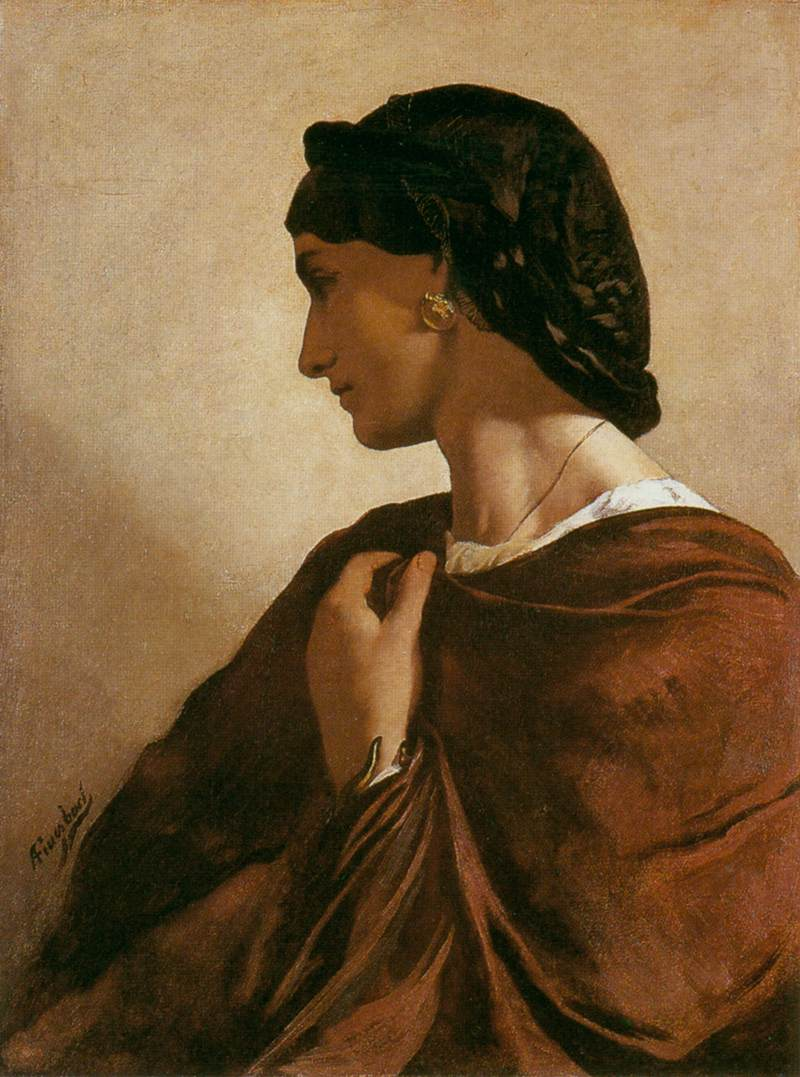
Anselm Feuerbach

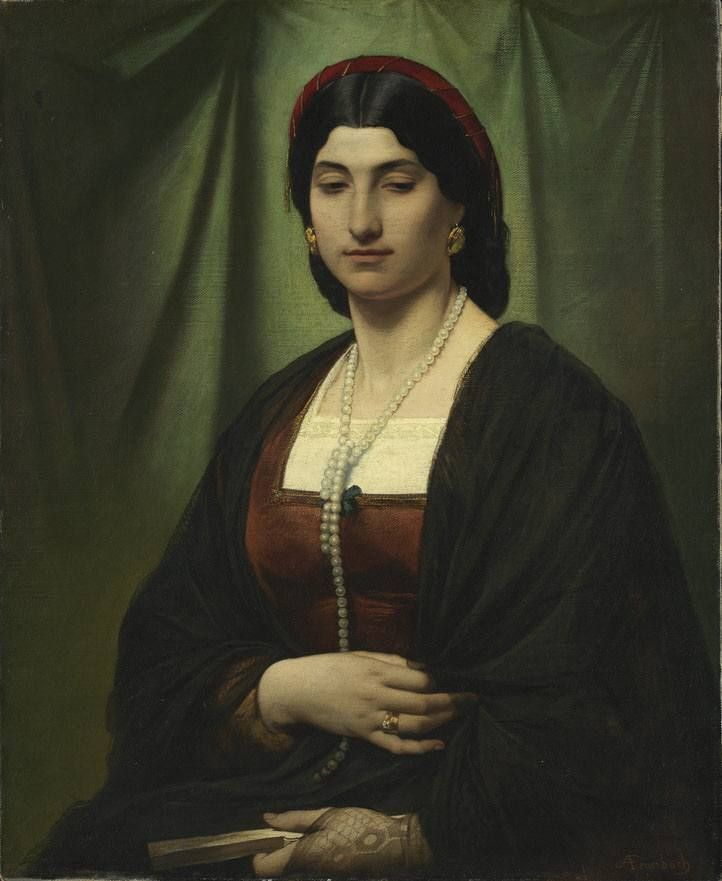
Anselm Feuerbach

=== Sculpture ===
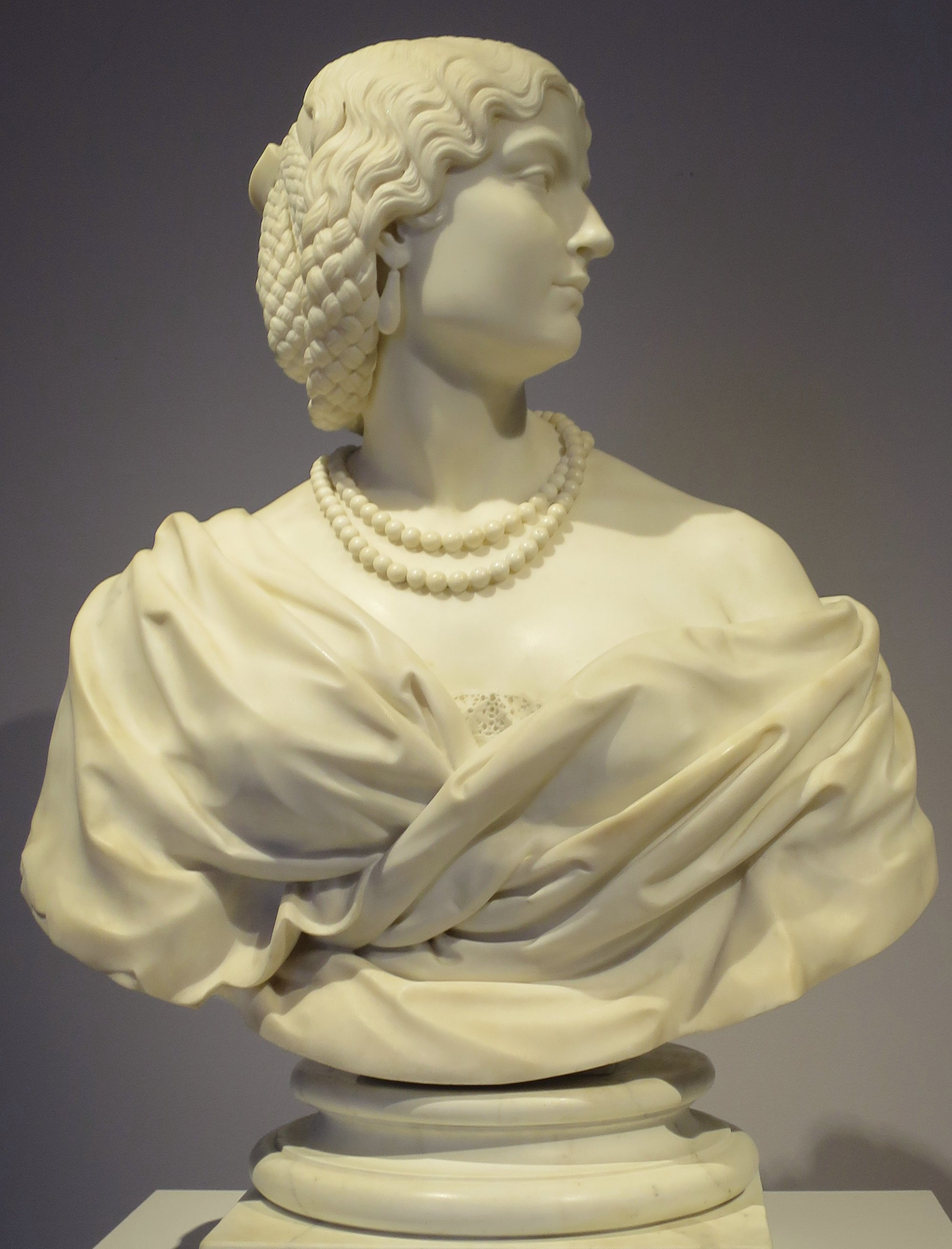
A Young Woman of Trastevere, 25 Years by Charles Cordier circa 1858/1860

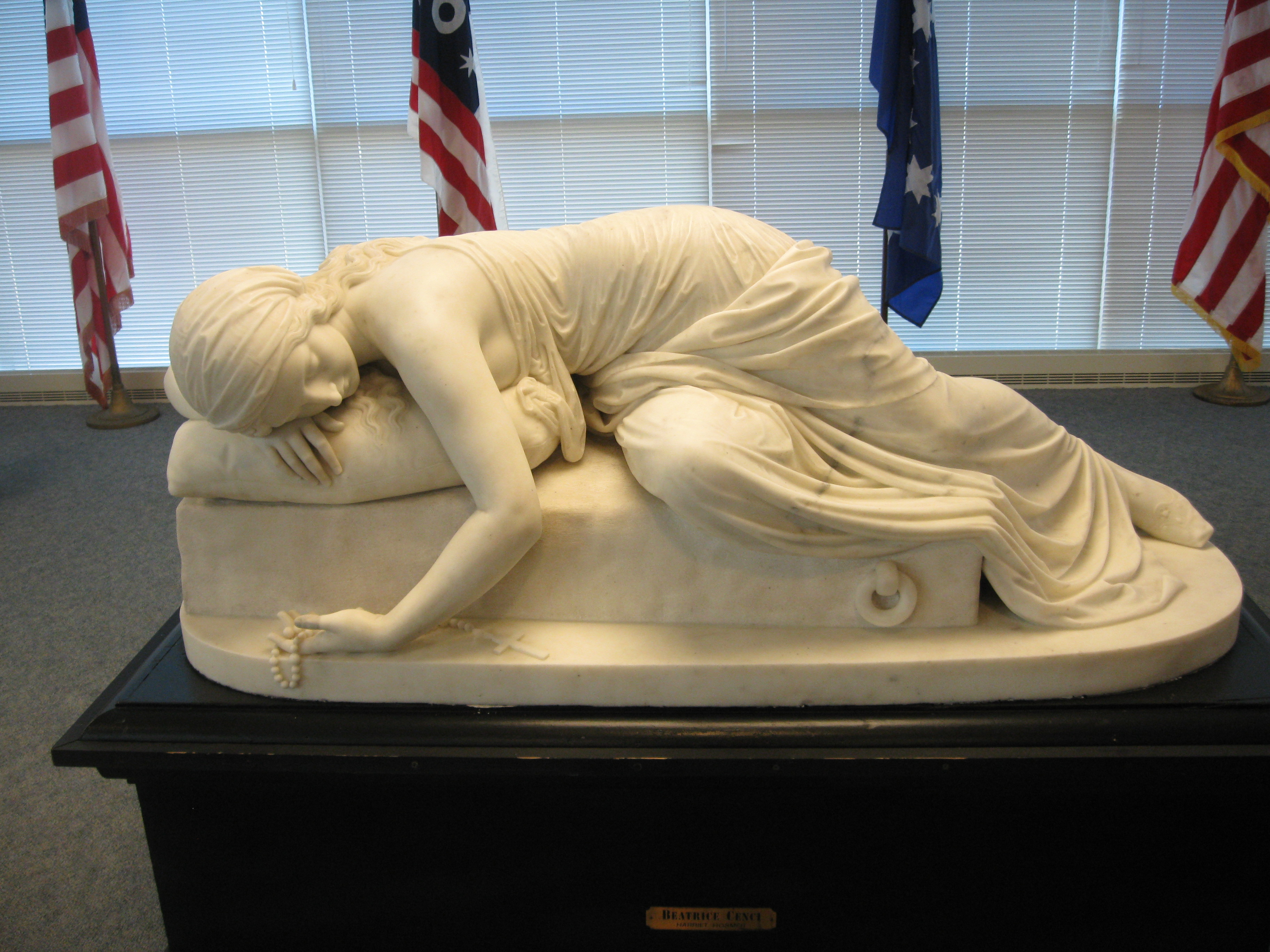
Risi as Beatrice Cenci in Beatrice Cenci by Harriet Hosmer

== See also ==
- 1203 Nanna
- List of people from Rome
- List of Italian women artists
