= Carlo Ademollo =

Italian painter (1824–1911)

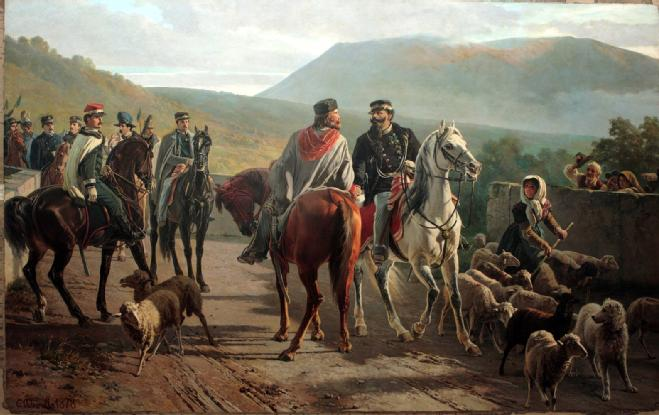
- The Handshake of Teano (c. 1860s–1870s)
- Born: Carlo Ademollo; 9 October 1824
- Died: 15 July 1911 (aged 86)

Carlo Ademollo (9 October 1824 – 15 July 1911) was an Italian painter, best known for his scenes from the Risorgimento.

== Biography ==
He was born in Florence. He was the grandson of Luigi Ademollo a Milanese painter, In 1838, he enrolled at the Accademia di Belle Arti di Firenze, where he studied with Giuseppe Bezzuoli. He had his first exhibition in 1848, with scenes of contemporary customs. He came from a liberal family, many of whose members enlisted as volunteers in the First War of Italian Independence but, as a painter, he remained strictly traditional. He briefly took part in the "Scuola di Staggia" (a group of landscape painters inspired by the Barbizon school) and frequented the Caffè Michelangiolo, but never joined the Macchiaioli.

Later, he moved away from landscapes and genre scenes to depict episodes from the Risorgimento; including the breach of the Porta Pia during the Capture of Rome, the "Handshake of Teano", between Garibaldi and King Victor Emmanuel, and the execution of Felice Orsini.

During the Second Italian War of Independence, he followed the army at his own expense and maintained an extensive correspondence with those involved, requesting details to help him create his paintings. He also participated in the Third Italian War of Independence, receiving the rank of Adjutant to the commander of the National Guard of Florence. Later, the King designated him the official painter of the Italian Army. In 1869, he was named a corresponding professor at his alma mater, the Accademia.

Ademollo died in Florence in 1911. Many of his letters and other personal items were donated to the "Istituto per la storia del Risorgimento italiano" by his nephew Umberto. The Instituto also possesses one of Ademollo's last works, a posthumous portrait of Adelaide Cairoli.

== Selected paintings ==
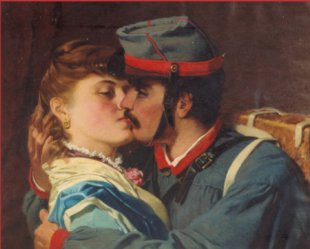
The Parting

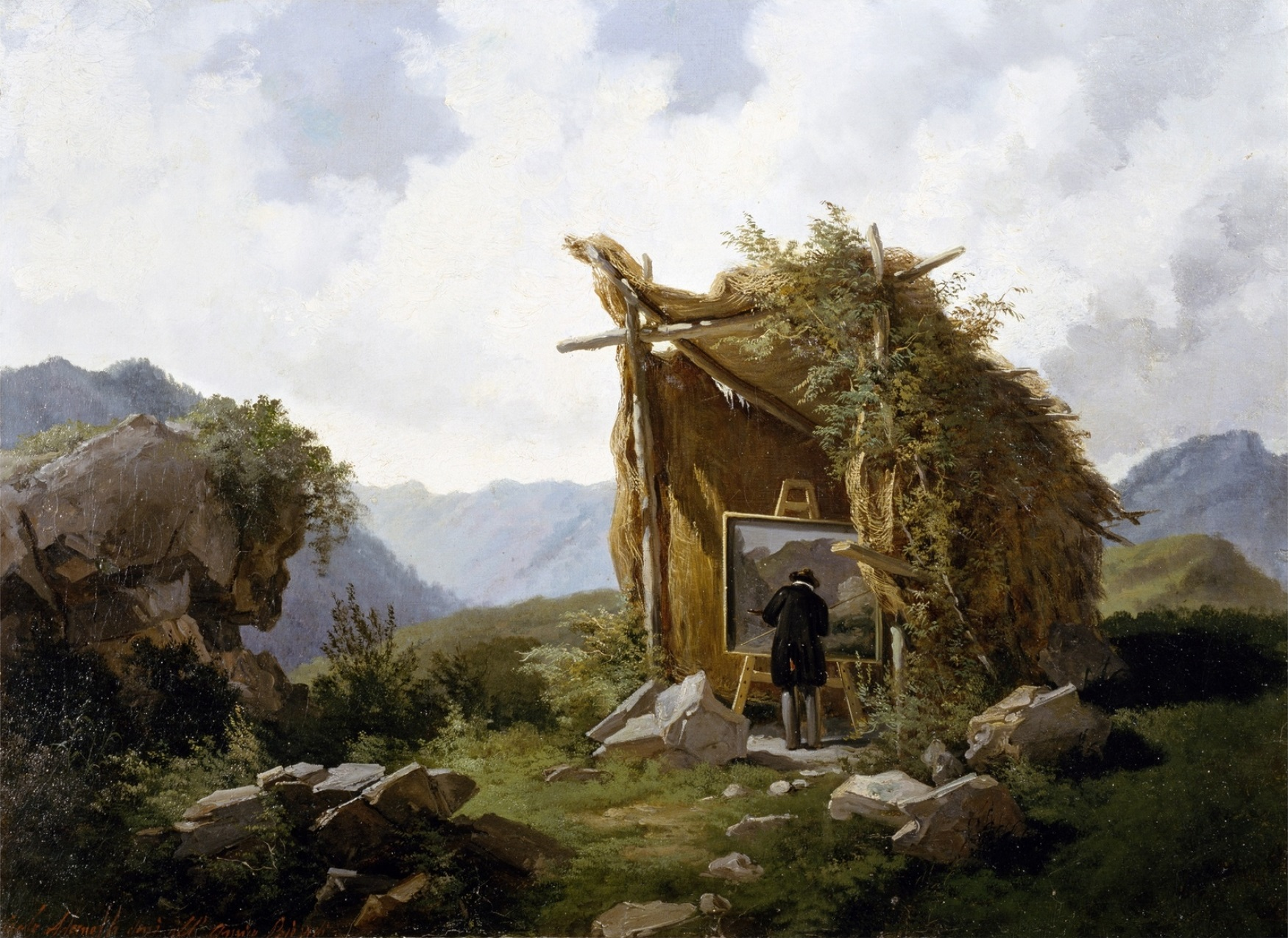
The Artist at Work (1857–1858)

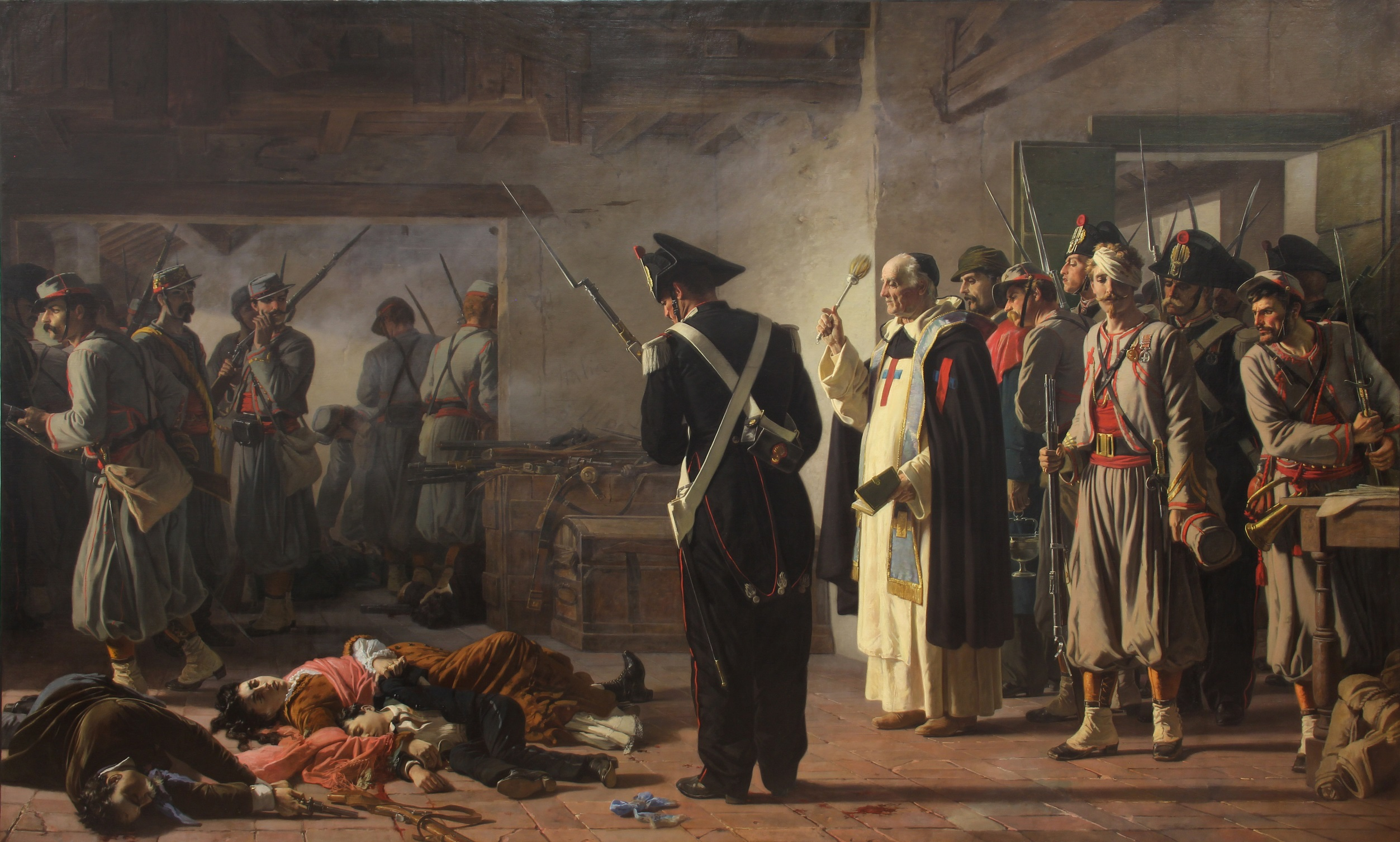
The Slaughter of Giuditta Tavani Arquati
and Her Family (1880)
