= 1203 Nanna =

Main-belt asteroid

Discovery
- Discovered by: M. F. Wolf
- Discovery site: Heidelberg Obs.
- Discovery date: 5 October 1931

Designations
- Named after: Anna Risi (model of painter); Anselm Feuerbach
- Alternative designations: 1931 TA · 1926 RH; 1978 AD
- Minor planet category: main-belt · (outer)

Orbital characteristics
- Epoch 16 February 2017 (JD 2457800.5)
- Uncertainty parameter 0
- Observation arc: 90.24 yr (32,960 days)
- Aphelion: 3.6055 AU
- Perihelion: 2.1795 AU
- Semi-major axis: 2.8925 AU
- Eccentricity: 0.2465
- Orbital period (sidereal): 4.92 yr (1,797 days)
- Mean anomaly: 137.21°
- Mean motion: 0° 12^{m} 1.44^{s} / day
- Inclination: 5.9706°
- Longitude of ascending node: 224.58°
- Argument of perihelion: 176.38°

Physical characteristics
- Dimensions: 31.80±1.22 km 32.59±0.87 km 35.06 km (derived); 35.18±3.9 km (IRAS:2); 35.92±15.13 km 37.91±12.03 km
- Synodic rotation period: 15.6±0.1 h (dated); 18.54±0.01 h 25.80±0.05 h
- Geometric albedo: 0.028±0.017; 0.03±0.01; 0.03 (derived); 0.04±0.00; 0.0473±0.012 (IRAS:2); 0.056±0.004
- Spectral type: C
- Absolute magnitude (H): 11.20 · 11.60 · 11.63±0.24 · 11.7 · 11.71

1203 Nanna (provisional designation 1931 TA) is a carbonaceous asteroid from the outer region of the asteroid belt, about 35 kilometers in diameter. It was discovered on 5 October 1931, by German astronomer Max Wolf at Heidelberg Observatory in southwest Germany, and named after Anna Risi, a model and mistress of painter Anselm Feuerbach.

== Orbit ==
Nanna is a dark C-type asteroid. It orbits the Sun at a distance of 2.2–3.6 AU once every 4 years and 11 months (1,797 days). Its orbit has an eccentricity of 0.25 and an inclination of 6° with respect to the ecliptic. In 1926, it was first identified as 1926 RH, extending the body's observation arc by 5 years prior to its official discovery observation.

== Rotation period ==
In September 2009, two rotational lightcurves of Nanna were obtained by American astronomer Brian Warner from photometric observations at his Palmer Divided Observatory in Colorado. The first lightcurve analysis gave a rotation period of 18.54 hours with a brightness variation of 0.12 magnitude (U=2), while the second lightcurve was ambiguous giving a period of 25.80 and 12.90 hours, respectively, and an amplitude of 0.15 (U=2). These results supersede a fragmentary lightcurve taken by French amateur astronomers Federico Manzini, Laurent Bernasconi and René Roy from August 2004, which gave a period of 15.6 hours (U=1).

== Diameter and albedo ==
According to the surveys carried out by the Infrared Astronomical Satellite IRAS, the Japanese Akari satellite, and NASA's Wide-field Infrared Survey Explorer with its subsequent NEOWISE mission, Nanna measures between 31.80 and 37.91 kilometers in diameter and its surface has an albedo of 0.028 and 0.056. The Collaborative Asteroid Lightcurve Link derives an albedo of 0.03 and a diameter of 35.06 kilometers with an absolute magnitude of 11.7.

== Naming ==
This minor planet was named after Anna Risi, a model in several paintings by German classicist painter Anselm Feuerbach. The official naming citation was published by Paul Herget in The Names of the Minor Planets in 1955 (H 112).
