= Massimo Mongai =

Italian writer (1950–2016)

- Born: 3 November 1950; Rome, Italy
- Died: 1 November 2016 (aged 65); Rome, Italy
- Occupations: Novelist, journalist
- Writing career
- Years active: 1993—2016
- Genres: Science fiction, crime fiction

Massimo Mongai (3 November 1950 – 1 November 2016) was an Italian writer of science fiction and crime fiction.

== Biography ==
Born in Rome, by the age of 12, Massimo Mongai was a dedicated reader of science fiction. He graduated in law.

According to the biography printed in many of his books, his influences include the science-fiction writers Isaac Asimov, A. E. van Vogt, Poul Anderson and Philip José Farmer and the crime writers Rex Stout and Andrea Camilleri.

== Works ==
In 1997, Mongai wrote Memorie di un cuoco d'astronave. This blend of space saga and cooking manual won Italy's Urania Award.

His other books include Il gioco degli immortali, Tette e pistole, Memorie di un cuoco di un bordello spaziale, Cronache non ufficiali di due spie italiane, Il Fascio sulle stelle di Benito Mussolini and Alienati, a novel about an inter-planetary convention of psychoanalysts.

Mongai also worked on the Italian magazine Il Falcone Maltese, dedicated to crime fiction, known in Italy as giallo.

- List of crime writers
- List of Italian writers
- List of people from Rome
- List of science-fiction writers
