= Giovanni Corbyons =

Italian footballer

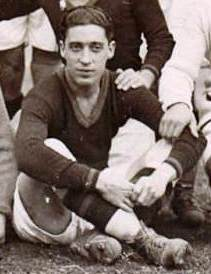

Personal information
- Date of birth: January 1, 1900
- Place of birth: Rome, Italy
- Position: Midfielder

Senior career*
Years	Team	Apps	(Gls)
1919–1921	Fortitudo Roma		
1921–1926	Alba Roma		
1926–1927	Fortitudo Roma	18	(0)
1927–1930	Roma	35	(2)
1930–1931	Fiorentina	19	(2)
1931–1932	Catania		
- * Club domestic league appearances and goals

Giovanni Corbyons (born January 1, 1900, in Rome; died 1967, in Rome) was an Italian professional football player.

He played 2 games in the Serie A in the 1929/30 season for A.S. Roma.
