= Umberto Massimo Lattuca =

Italian footballer

Personal information
- Date of birth: 14 April 1959 (age 67)
- Place of birth: Rome, Italy
- Height: 1.79 m (5 ft 10 1/2 in)
- Position: Defender

Senior career*
Years	Team	Apps	(Gls)
1976–1980	Roma	1	(0)
1980–1983	Latina	72	(4)
1983–1984	Siena	15	(0)
1984–1986	Pro Cisterna		
1986–1989	Frosinone	88	(7)
1989–1990	Teramo	30	(2)
1990–1991	Vigor Lamezia	26	(1)
1991–1992	Frosinone		
- * Club domestic league appearances and goals

Umberto Massimo Lattuca, also known as simply Massimo Lattuca (born 14 April 1959 in Rome) is a retired Italian professional football player.

He played his only Serie A game in the 1978/79 season for A.S. Roma, playing in the lower leagues for the rest of his career.

== See also ==
- Football in Italy
- List of football clubs in Italy
