= Giordano Pellegrino =

Italian footballer (born 1986)

Personal information
- Full name: Giordano Pellegrino
- Date of birth: 31 January 1986 (age 40)
- Place of birth: Rome, Italy
- Position: Midfielder

Youth career
- US Alessandria Calcio 1912
- Fiorentina
- 2003-2004: Livingston
- Lazio

Senior career*
Years	Team	Apps	(Gls)
2005-2006	US Alessandria Calcio 1912		
2006	Novara		
2006	AC Bellinzona	11	(3)
2006-2007	Pistoiese		
2007	Lanciano		
2007-2008	Fanfulla		
2008-2012	FC Porrentruy		
- Atletico Kick Off
- * Club domestic league appearances and goals as of 17:00, 5 November 2022 (UTC)

Giordano Pellegrino (born 31 January 1986) is an Italian former professional footballer who played as a midfielder.

== Club career ==
Pellegrino started his career in the youth academy of US Alessandria Calcio 1912. In 2003, he signed for Scottish side Livingston along with fellow Italian Alessandro Cosimi. However the stay lasted less than a season for both players, following a disagreement with then manager Jim Leishman.

In 2005, Pellegrino signed professionally with Italian side US Alessandria Calcio 1912.

Pellegrino also had spells playing for clubs in Switzerland.

The midfielder played for amateur side Atletico Kick Off in the latter stages of his career.

== International career ==
In October 2004, Pellegrino was called up to the Italy national under-18 football team.
