= Giacomo Valentini =

Italian footballer

Personal information
- Date of birth: May 16, 1911
- Place of birth: Rome, Italy
- Position: Midfielder

Senior career*
| Years | Team | Apps | (Gls) |
| 1934–1935 | Montepaschi Roma | | |
| 1935–1936 | Roma | 6 | (1) |
| 1936–1937 | L'Aquila | 25 | (5) |
| 1937–1939 | M.A.T.E.R. | | |
- * Club domestic league appearances and goals

Giacomo Valentini (born 16 May 1911, in Rome) was an Italian professional football player.

He played six matches, and scored one goal in the 1935/36 Serie A season for A.S. Roma.
