= Maria Monaci Gallenga =

Italian textile designer and fashion designer

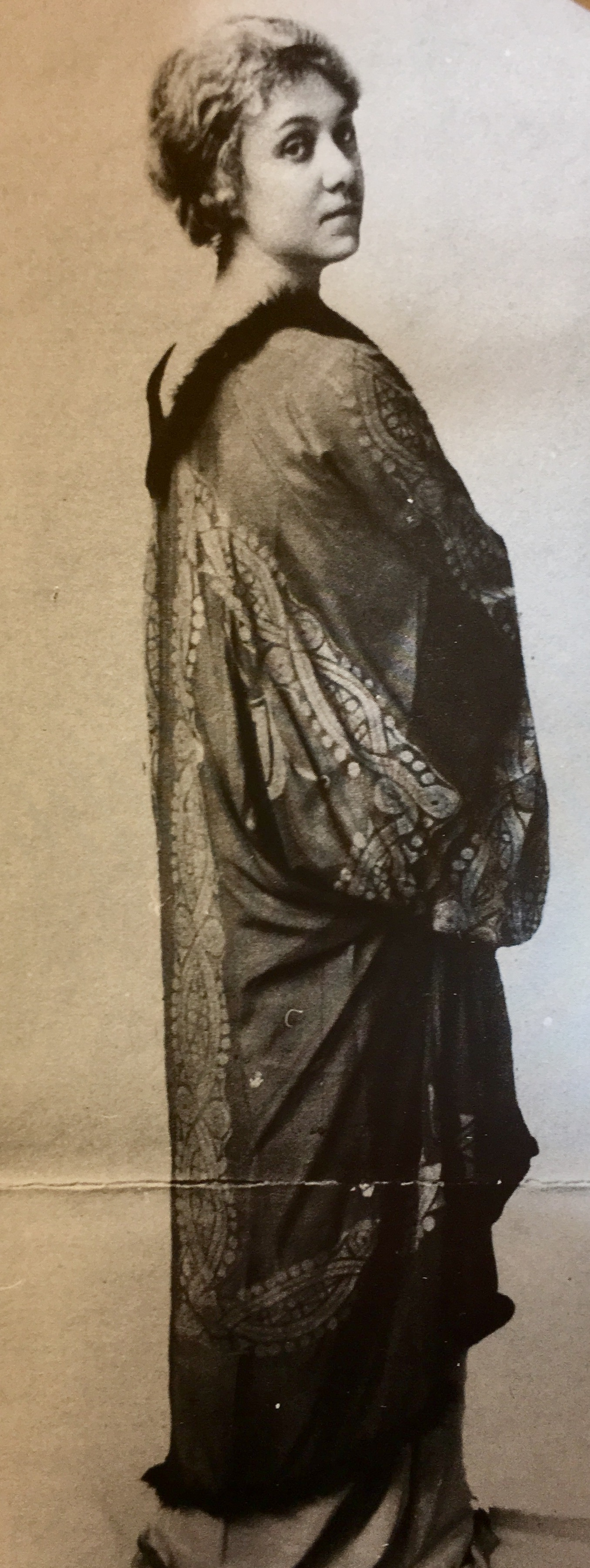
Maria Monaci Gallenga

Maria Monaci Gallenga (1880–1944) was an Italian textile designer and fashion designer. Along with her husband, Gallenga invented a unique metallic, block printing technique for fabrics that gave her textiles a distinct hue.

== Early life ==
Maria Monaci Gallenga was born in Rome in 1880. Born into a prominent family of academics, as a young girl she was fascinated with history and particularly in medieval and Renaissance Italian art history. In 1903 she married Peter Gallenga, a professor at the University of Rome.

== Career ==
Gallenga started designing and making textiles and clothing in 1914 out of a studio in Florence. She often exhibited her designs in art exhibitions. These designs combined a unique mixture of old world motifs, such as heavy velvet and medieval patterns, with more modern 1920s silhouettes. Gallenga also had a flair for theatricality and designed many cloaks and capes. In 1923, Gallenga was awarded a Silver Medal at the Monza design exhibition. In 1928, Gallenga co-founded the Boutique Italienne in Paris with the designers Bice Pittoni and Carla Visconti di Modrone.

In line with her passion for history, many of her textile pattern titles reference medieval and Renaissance history. For example, the "Mona Tessa" is a reference to the mother of Beatrice Portinari, the muse of Dante Alighieri.

== Death ==
Gallenga died in 1944 in Italy.

== Public collections ==
Gallenga's work can be found in a number of public institutions, including:

- Fine Arts Museum of San Francisco
- RISD Museum
- Philadelphia Museum of Art
- Victoria and Albert Museum
- Art Institute of Chicago
- Metropolitan Museum of Art
- Ulster Museum
