= Orazio Bianchi =

Italian painter

Orazio Bianchi was an Italian painter of the Baroque period. He was born in Rome. He painted Marriage of St. Joseph and the Virgin Mary for the church of San Gioseffo in Rome.
