= Yiram of Magdiel =

10-century Italian Jewish bible commentator

Yiram of Magdiel (Hebrew: יראם המגדיאלי, fl. tenth century) was a minor Italian Jewish commentator on the Bible, active in Rome. The term Magdiel, which appears in Genesis 36:43, was apparently interpreted as Rome (see Rashi on that verse), so that his name was really Yiram of Rome.

Yiram was a younger contemporary of Saadia Gaon and perhaps even his student. He apparently wrote a commentary on the Books of Chronicles, which is only known from a handful of quotes by the Commentary on Chronicles Attributed to a Student of Saadia Gaon.
