= Broccolini (surname) =

Broccolini is an Italian surname that may refer to

- Lidia Broccolino (born Lidia Broccolini in 1958), Italian film, television and stage actress

== Similar names ==
- Signor Brocolini, the stage name of the opera singer and actor John Clark (1841–1906).

== See also ==
- Broccolini, a vegetable
