= Armando Preti =

Italian footballer (born 1911)

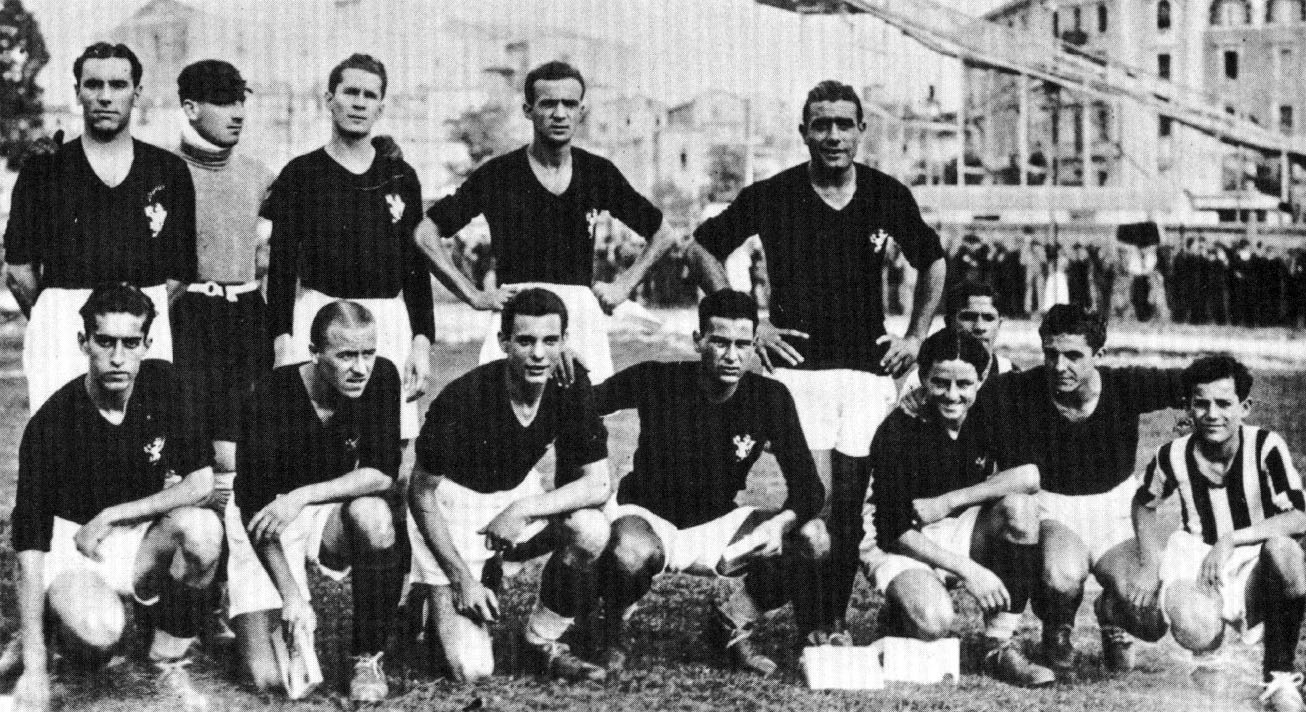

Personal information
- Date of birth: February 19, 1911
- Place of birth: Rome, Italy
- Position: Striker

Senior career*
Years	Team	Apps	(Gls)
1929–1931	Roma	5	(3)
1931–1932	Lecce	18	(4)
1932–1933	Foligno		
1933–1934	Perugia	33	(10)
1934–1935	Pisa	22	(13)
1935–1936	Lazio	0	(0)
1936–1943	M.A.T.E.R.		
- * Club domestic league appearances and goals

Armando Preti (February 19, 1911 – ?) was an Italian professional football player.

He played for two seasons (six games, three goals) in the Serie A for A.S. Roma.
