= Armando Colafrancesco =

Italian footballer (born 1951)

Personal information
- Date of birth: 4 October 1951 (age 75)
- Place of birth: Rome, Italy
- Height: 1.74 m (5 ft 9 in)
- Position: Midfielder

Senior career*
Years	Team	Apps	(Gls)
1969–1971	Roma	3	(0)
1971–1972	Avellino	1	(0)
1972–1973	Viterbese	29	(?)
1973–1977	Siena	72	(0)
- * Club domestic league appearances and goals

Armando Colafrancesco (born 4 October 1951) is an Italian former footballer who, playing as a midfielder, made 33 appearances in the Italian professional leagues. The three games he played in his debut 1969–70 season for A.S. Roma remained his only appearances in Serie A.

== See also ==
- Football in Italy
- List of football clubs in Italy
