= Valeria Sannucci =

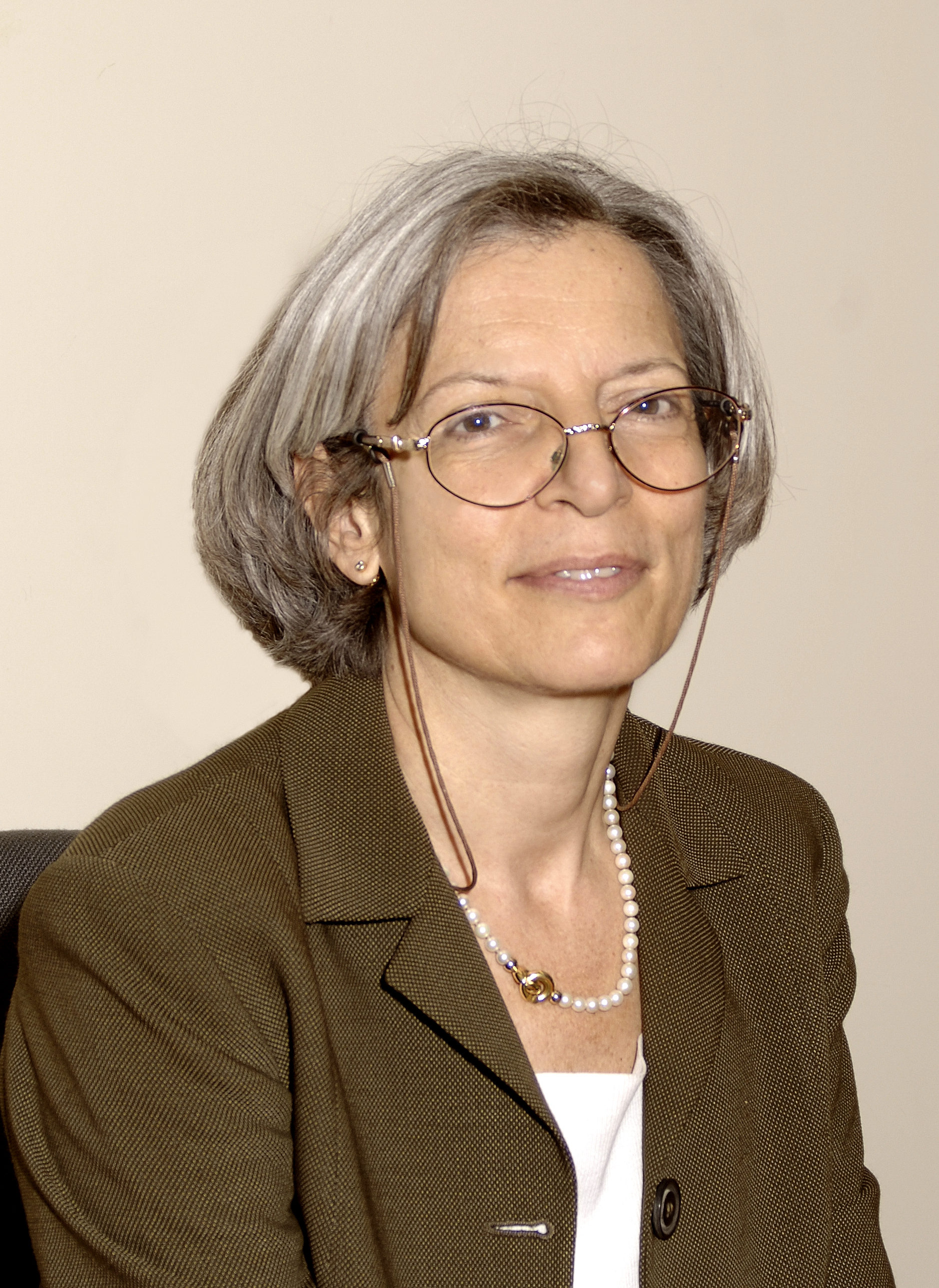
- In office 10 May 2013 – 9 May 2019

Deputy Governor of the Bank of Italy

Personal details
- Born: 19 April 1953 (age 73) Rome, Italy
- Education: Sapienza University of Rome
- Profession: Economist

Valeria Sannucci has been Deputy Governor and member of the Governing Board of the Bank of Italy and of the joint Governing Board of the Insurance Supervisory Authority (IVASS).

== Education and career ==
In 1976, Valeria Sannucci graduated in economics from Rome's La Sapienza University and later obtained an economics Master of Arts from Columbia University in New York City.

Having entered the Bank of Italy in 1977, Valeria Sannucci became director of the Human Resources Management Area in 2006, then, in 2012, central director for the coordination of the Bank of Italy's participation to the Eurosystem and to the European Banking Union.

As of May 10, 2013, she is a member of the Governing Board and the deputy governor of the Bank of Italy.

Valeria Sannucci has two sons and appears to be fond of movies and history. She claims to be a reader of Paul Auster and J. D. Salinger. She is the second woman to participate to the Directorate of the Bank of Italy, after Anna Maria Tarantola, actual RAI President.

== Works ==
- "La costruzione dei dati", in I bilanci delle aziende di credito 1890-1936, Collana storica della Banca d'Italia, Laterza, Rome 1996
- "Finanza ed economia: considerazioni di metodo" (with Pierluigi Ciocca), in Il progresso economico dell'Italia, Il Mulino, Bologna 1994
- "The Establishment of a Central Bank: Italy in the Nineteenth Century", in Currency for Europe, Lothian Foundation Press, London 1991
- "Molteplicità delle banche di emissione: ragioni economiche ed effetti sull'efficacia del controllo monetario (1860-1890)", Laterza, Rome 1990
- "Nota sulla ricerca storica della Banca d'Italia" (with Franco Cotula), Rivista di storia economica, vol. 6, no. 3, 1989
- "L'andamento dei profitti bancari rispetto al ciclo economico", Bancaria, no. 11, 1983
- "Le nuove procedure operative di controllo monetario negli Stati Uniti (1979-81)", (with Stefano Micossi), Giornale degli economisti e annali di economia, no. 2, 1982
