= Simcha of Rome =

Simcha of Rome was a Jewish scholar and rabbi who lived in Rome in the last quarter of the 13th century . He was given an open letter by the community and sent out to find Maimonides' Commentary on the Mishnah and bring it back with him. He traveled through Provence and Catalonia without meeting with any success. At Barcelona, he applied for assistance to Solomon ben Adret, who gave him a further letter of recommendation. After a prolonged search, he found in Huesca the commentary on the first three orders, and shortly afterward the Arabic original of the commentary on the first five orders. The latter was thereupon translated into Hebrew by several scholars between 1296 and 1298, and Simcha returned with it to Rome, after having encountered various dangers on his journey. He appears to have written some books also, although, with the exception of certain fragments in Shibbole ha-Lekhet, nothing written by him has been preserved.

== Sources ==
- Jacobs, Joseph and Schulim Ochser. "Simhah of Rome". Jewish Encyclopedia. Funk and Wagnalls, 1901–1906; citing:

- Vogelstein and Rieger, Gesch. der Juden in Rom, pp. 154, 265.
