= Cesare Francalancia =

Italian footballer (born 1916)

Personal information
- Date of birth: December 27, 1916
- Place of birth: Rome, Italy
- Position: Goalkeeper

Senior career*
Years	Team	Apps	(Gls)
1936–1938	Roma	2	(0)
1938–1939	M.A.T.E.R.		
1939–1940	Sora		
1940–1941	M.A.T.E.R.		
1941–1944	Vigili Fuoco Roma		
1944–1948	Roma	25	(0)
- * Club domestic league appearances and goals

Cesare Francalancia (born December 27, 1916) was an Italian professional football player.

He played for 3 seasons (9 games) in the Serie A for A.S. Roma as a backup goalkeeper.
