= Francesco Quintini =

Italian footballer

Personal information
- Date of birth: 27 May 1952 (age 74)
- Place of birth: Rome, Italy
- Height: 1.68 m (5 ft 6 in)
- Position: Goalkeeper

Senior career*
Years	Team	Apps	(Gls)
1971–1977	Roma	9	(0)
1977–1979	Banco di Roma		
- * Club domestic league appearances and goals

Francesco Quintini (born 27 May 1952) is an Italian former professional footballer who played as a goalkeeper.

He made nine appearances in Serie A for A.S. Roma spread over six seasons. In his debut 1971–72 season he was the shortest goalkeeper in Serie A with the height of 1.68 m (5 ft 6 in).

== Honours ==
- Anglo-Italian Cup winner: 1972
