= Marco Belladonna =

Italian footballer

Personal information
- Date of birth: 18 July 1916
- Place of birth: Rome, Italy
- Date of death: 10 October 2003 (aged 87)
- Position: Striker

Senior career*
Years	Team	Apps	(Gls)
1933–1935	Roma	1	(0)
1935–1936	Cosenza		
- * Club domestic league appearances and goals

https://commons.wikimedia.org/wiki/File:Fernando Belladonna.jpg

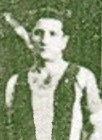

Marco Belladonna (18 July 1916 – 10 October 2003), also known as Fernando Belladonna, was an Italian football player. who last played for Cosenza Calcio. His position was striker.

He played one game in the Serie A in the 1933/34 season for A.S. Roma. Before being loaned out to Cosenza Calcio

He was given a permanent ban from Italian football for striking a referee during a match against Sambenedettese. After this, he continued to play semi-professionally with the Roman amateur side Ernesto Breda.

== Early life ==
After rising through the ranks of the Giallorossi's minor leagues, standing out above all for his good finishing ability and the vivacity that characterised his play, he made his first-team debut at a very young age, in September 1933, in a match against Brescia, but was unable to convince critics and fans of his true potential as a real footballer.

== death ==
Marco Belladonna died in Rome on 10 October 2003 at the age of 87.
