= Marco Luly =

Italian actor, director and theatre teacher

Marco Luly is an Italian actor, director and drama teacher. In 1990, Marco Luly founded with Luciana Codispoti the Associazione Culturale "Luoghi dell'Arte" in Rome, and has been artistic director of the company since then. Luly's area of specialization is in the production of commedia dell'arte, medieval theatre and plays by the father of Italian comedy, Carlo Goldoni.

From 1990, his portfolio has increased to include directing and writing plays for Luoghi dell’Arte. He is committed to reviving medieval and commedia dell'arte theatre, and has won distinctions for rediscovering medieval and renaissance period manuscripts and adapting them in a modern style.

Luly has won string of awards, including:

- Best Director in 1992, 1993, 1995, 1998, 1999; Best Author in 1997; Best Show in 1992, 1995, 1999, at the Medieval Theatre Festival of Trieste (Italy).
- Best Show and best Director for the production: "Doctor Harlequin, the imaginary autopsy" at the Mostar International Festival (Bosnia-Herz.).

Since 1993 Marco led his group to several tours to Southeast Asia (Thailand, Malaysia, Singapore, Indonesia, Vietnam, Myanmar), to Pakistan, India, China, Morocco, and to France, Germany, UK, Switzerland, Serbia, Slovenia, Bosnia-Herzegovina and Croatia, Turkey, and to the USA, to give lectures, performances, and workshops at the invitation of the embassies of Italy and Italian Cultural Institutes, of the drama departments of universities, of international schools, and on occasion of international festivals and theatre events. He has conducted classes on commedia dell'arte history and techniques, given lectures, and has worked in cross-cultural productions with students and actors in many countries.
