= Francesco Arquati =

Francesco Arquati (27 September 1810, in Filettino – 25 October 1867, in Rome) was an Italian republican patriot, a notable figure in the Italian Risorgimento and a so-called martyr for the cause of a United Italy.

Born in a small comune at the border between the Papal State and the Borbon State, son of Vincenzo and Sinforosa Arquati; he dedicated himself to the political life, took part in the citizens' government and in 1851 was included in the lottery for nomination to 'prior', following his nationalistic and secular feelings away from the land of his birth, first towards Sublicio and then Rome.

== A warriors' love story ==
In 1844, he met Giuditta Tavani, a girl of barely fourteen, being a frequent visitor to the material warehouse of her father. They married almost immediately in the parish of S. Crisogono in Rome.

In spite of Giuditta's young age, she saw in Francesco a man who, like her, loved 'liberty' and supported a secular Italian State. They married immediately and fought together to defend the Roman Republic, which, nevertheless fell into French hands in 1849, restoring the Papal Government.

They followed the retreat towards the Adriatic to avoid heavy papal reprisals, they headed, with Garibaldi, towards Venice. Subsequently, still refugees, passing through Romagna, where they continued to conspire, then re-entered Rome, hidden to organise its liberation. Here they frequented the home and the wool shop of Giulio Ajani (1835–1890), a forgotten patriot of the time, in the Lungaretta in Trastevere.

== The battle in the Ajani wool mill. ==
In the late morning of 25 October 1867 around forty 'patriots', of whom twenty-five were Romans were meeting in via della Lungaretta 97, in the Roman region of Trastevere, within Giulio Ajani's wool factory. The group, who were conspiring against the government of Pope Pius IX, anticipated that a direct attack by Giuseppe Garibaldi on Rome would follow shortly after. The battle at Villa Glori on 23 October 1867 caused everyone to expect an attack and a popular uprising.

Francesco Arquati, his wife, one of their three sons, Antonio, and their comrades had gathered to prepare cartridges, restock the rifles of their arsenal, and be ready to support Garibaldi, in what they thought would be an imminent attack on Rome.

At around half past twelve, a platoon of papal zuavos from via del Moro, the perpendicular street in Trastevere attacked the wool-mill building. The conspirators tried to resist the fire. Within a short time, however, the papal troops had the better of the situation, and managed to take the building. A few conspirators managed to escape whilst others were captured. In the fire, nine people were killed, amongst whom, Giudita Arquati, pregnant with her fourth child, her husband and their young son.

In 1939, the remains of Francesco, his wife Giuditta, and their son Antonio, were transported to the Monumental Charnel House on the Janiculum hill.

== The memory ==
The figures of Francesco and Giuditta Arquati became symbols of the struggle for the liberation of Rome and for years the inhabitants of Trastevere and their secular and republican associations commemorated the slaughter.

== Related material ==
- Giuditta Tavani Arquati
- Risorgimento
- Roman Question
- Roman Republic

== Bibliography ==
- Augusto Sterlini. Ricordi del vecchio Trastevere . Arti grafiche e fotomeccaniche P. Sansoni; Italian/1932 .
- Giorgio Carpaneto. La grande guida dei rioni di Roma . Newton & Compton; Italian/2004 .
- Filippo Caraffa. Storia di Filettino . Biblioteca di Latium, Istituto di Storia e di Arte del Lazio Meridionale, Italian/1989.
