= Giampiero Pocetta =

Italian footballer

Personal information
- Date of birth: May 25, 1965 (age 61)
- Place of birth: Rome, Italy
- Height: 5 ft 10 in (1.78 m)
- Position: Midfielder

Team information
- Current team: Fano

Senior career*
Years	Team	Apps	(Gls)
1984–1987	Ternana	85	(1)
1987–1992	Palermo	135	(3)
1992–1993	Viareggio	14	(0)
1993–1994	Ternana	31	(0)
1994–1995	Ternana	27	(0)
1995–1996	Monterotondo	26	(2)
1996–1997	Crotone	18	(1)
1997–1998	Frosinone	9	(1)
1997–1998	Palermo	13	(0)
1998–1999	Fano	7	(0)
- * Club domestic league appearances and goals as of May 06, 2009

Giampiero Pocetta (born May 25, 1965 in Rome) is an Italian former soccer player, active as a midfielder during the eighties and the nineties.

He collected 102 played matches and three goals scored in Italian Serie D with teams Ternana, Monterotondo and Crotone, 86 matches played and one goal scored in Italian Serie C2 with teams Ternana, Palermo, Viareggio, Frosinone and Fano, 159 played matches and four goals scored in Italian Serie C1 with teams Ternana and Palermo, 18 played matches and no goals in Italian Serie B with team Palermo.
