= Mauro Nardoni =

Italian footballer

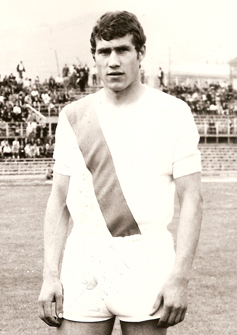

Personal information
- Date of birth: February 18, 1945 (age 81)
- Place of birth: Rome, Italy
- Height: 1.70 m (5 ft 7 in)
- Position: Midfielder

Senior career*
Years	Team	Apps	(Gls)
1964–1966	Roma	9	(0)
1966	L.R. Vicenza	2	(0)
1966–1967	Palermo	26	(5)
1967	Brescia	5	(0)
1967–1968	Livorno	26	(8)
1968–1969	Brescia	13	(3)
1969–1970	Reggiana	20	(2)
1970–1973	Brescia	50	(13)
- * Club domestic league appearances and goals

Mauro Nardoni (born February 18, 1945, in Rome) is a retired Italian professional football player.

He played for four seasons (16 games, no goals) in the Serie A for A.S. Roma, Vicenza Calcio and Brescia Calcio.

== See also ==
- Football in Italy
- List of football clubs in Italy
