= Giuditta Tavani Arquati =

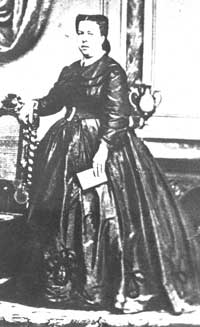
- Early Photo of Giuditta Tavani Arquati
- Born: 30 April 1830; Rome, Papal States
- Died: 25 October 1867 (aged 37); Trastevere, Rome, Italy
- Monuments: via della Lungaretta, Trastevere
- Movement: Supporter of United Italy

Giuditta Tavani Arquati (Rome, 30 April 1830 – Rome, 25 October 1867) was an Italian republican patriot, a notable figure in the Italian Risorgimento and a martyr for the cause of a United Italy.

Daughter of a defender of the Roman Republic of 1849, exiled to Venice after a long sentence in the papal prisons, Giuditta Tavani grew up in an environment that instilled secular and republican ideals within her.

Giuditta was born in 1830 to Giustino Tavani and Adelaide Mambor, and in 1844 married Francesco Arquati (Filettino, 27 September 1810 – Rome, 25 October 1867), also a patriot she lent on him, and followed his political path.

When she met her husband Francesco, Giuditta was only fourteen. She married him in 1844 in the Roman parish church of St. Crisogono (in Trastevere) and gave him nine children. With him, she moved first to Subiaco and then in 1865 to Rome.

== Battle in the Ajani wool mill ==
In the late morning of 25 October 1867 around forty patriots, of whom twenty-five were Romans were meeting in via della Lungaretta 97, in the Roman neighborhood of Trastevere, within Giulio Ajani's wool factory.

The group, who were conspiring against the government of Pope Pius IX, anticipated that a direct attack by Giuseppe Garibaldi on Rome would follow shortly after. The battle at Villa Glori on 23 October 1867 caused everyone to expect an attack and a popular uprising.

Giuditta Arquati, her husband, one of their three sons, Antonio, and their comrades had gathered to prepare cartridges, restock the rifles of their arsenal, and be ready to support Garibaldi, in what they thought would be an imminent attack on Rome.

At around half past twelve, a platoon of Papal Zouaves from via del Moro, the perpendicular street in Trastevere attacked the wool-mill building. The conspirators tried to resist the fire. Within a short time, however, the papal troops had the better of the situation, and managed to take the building. A few conspirators managed to escape whilst others were captured. In the fire, nine people were killed, amongst whom, Giuditta Arquati, pregnant with her fourth child, her husband and their young son.

"...Signora Arquati, passing from one room to the other, brought munitions to the combatants and animated them, helped the wounded... the three hundred enemies were three times repelled... when, after two hours, another three hundred zuavos arrived; the struggle infuriated more than before.

Signora Arquati presenting her enemies with bombs and loaded rifles to her enemies "Viva l’Italia," they cried; "Viva Roma. We won't relinquish to those assassins. Courage!"; and squeezed the hand of her husband and kissed the hair of her young son whilst handing them their loaded rifles..." The zuavos managed to enter the building. Signora Arquati is at the entrance to see the enemies and is caught more than once at point-blank range but is not killed, and manages to reach her son and husband.

They are killed in front of her eyes and then she too, was pierced by a bayonet."

== Legacy ==
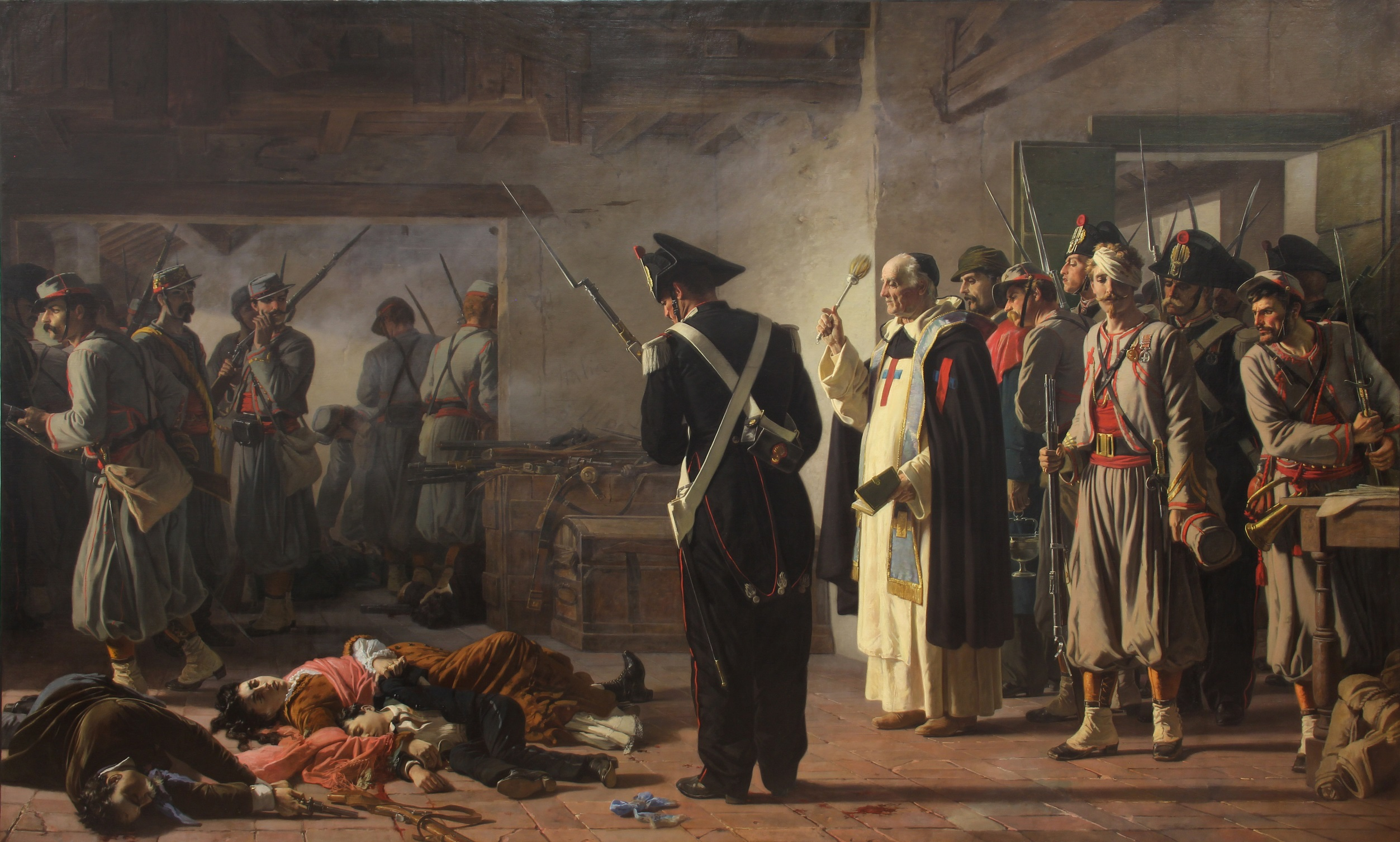
The Slaughter of Giuditta Tavani Arquati and Her Family, painted by Carlo Ademollo.

The figure of Giuditta Tavani Arquati became a symbol of the struggle for the liberation of Rome and for years the inhabitants of Trastevere and their secular and republican associations commemorated the slaughter.

On 9 February 1887, the 'Giuditta Tavani Arquati Democratic Association' was founded which inspired many secular and anti-clerical activities. The association was dissolved in 1925 during the Fascist years - specifically, when Mussolini embarked on his raprochment with the Catholic Church, which would culminate in the Lateran Treaty. It was re-established after the war.

On the first of November 1909, piazza Romana near to the wool mill in via della Lungaretta was renamed Piazza Giuditta Tavani Arquati.

== Bibliography ==
- Augusto Sterlini. Ricordi del vecchio Trastevere. Arti grafiche e fotomeccaniche P. Sansoni; Italian/1932.
- Giorgio Carpaneto. La grande guida dei rioni di Roma. Newton & Compton; Italian/2004.
- Filippo Caraffa. Storia di Filettino. Biblioteca di Latium, Istituto di Storia e di Arte del Lazio Meridionale, Italian/1989.
