= Alessandro Boccolini =

Italian football goalkeeper (born 1984)

Personal information
- Date of birth: 14 July 1984 (age 42)
- Place of birth: Rome, Italy
- Height: 1.84 m (6 ft 0 in)
- Position: Goalkeeper

Youth career
- 2001–2003: Lazio

Senior career*
Years	Team	Apps	(Gls)
2003–2004	Viterbese	0	(0)
2004–2005	Alessandria	0	(0)
2005–2007	Ascoli	3	(0)
2007–2008	Ivrea	3	(0)
2008	Canavese	1	(0)
2008–2009	Flaminia Civitacastellana		
2009–2011	Civitavecchia		
2011-2012	Cynthia		
2012-2013	Civitavecchia		
2013-2015	Viterbese		
- * Club domestic league appearances and goals

Alessandro Boccolini (born 14 July 1984) is an Italian football manager and former player, who played as a goalkeeper.

He moved to Ascoli for the 2005-06 season, having previously being signed with Alessandria and Viterbese. He left the club in June 2007, after three appearances in two Serie A campaigns (one in 2005–06, two in 2006–07) as Ascoli's backup goalkeeper, and was announced by Serie C2 side Ivrea in September 2007 in a free transfer. He was then sold to F.C. Canavese, another Serie C2 team, during the January 2008 transfer window. He ended his playing career in 2015 and started coaching youth sides, moving afterwards to numerous Serie D teams.
