= Franco Frasi =

Italian footballer

Personal information
- Date of birth: 11 January 1928
- Place of birth: Rome, Italy
- Date of death: 9 April 2009 (aged 81)
- Place of death: Italy
- Position: Midfielder

Senior career*
Years	Team	Apps	(Gls)
1948–1949	Roma	2	(0)
1949–1952	Verona	111	(9)
1952–1953	Roma	0	(0)
1953–1956	Pro Patria	50	(0)
1956–1958	Verona	57	(3)
- * Club domestic league appearances and goals

Franco Frasi, also known as Francesco Frasi (11 January 1928 – 9 April 2009), was an Italian professional football player.

== Career ==
Born in Rome, Frasi played for 4 seasons (44 games, 2 goals) in the Serie A for A.S. Roma, Aurora Pro Patria 1919 and Hellas Verona F.C. He scored eleven goals in 150 appearances for Hellas Verona and helped the club achieve promotion to Serie A for the first time.
