= Tiziano Maggiolini =

Italian footballer

Personal information
- Date of birth: 2 April 1980 (age 46)
- Place of birth: Rome, Italy
- Height: 1.80 m (5 ft 11 in)
- Position: Left wing-back

Senior career*
Years	Team	Apps	(Gls)
1998–2000	Lodigiani	28	(6)
2000–2002	Venezia	0	(0)
2000–2001	→ Palermo (loan)	13	(2)
2001–2002	→ Lodigiani (loan)	29	(3)
2002–2003	Ternana	0	(0)
2002–2003	→ Pescara (loan)	8	(0)
2003–2004	Lanciano	27	(4)
2004–2005	Grosseto	30	(2)
2005–2007	Ternana	0	(0)
2006	→ Frosinone (loan)	10	(1)
2007–2009	Novara	51	(2)
2009–2010	Cosenza	30	(3)
2010–2011	Ravenna	23	(2)
2011–2012	Latina	14	(0)
Total		263	(25)
- * Club domestic league appearances and goals

Tiziano Maggiolini (born 2 April 1980) is an Italian former professional footballer. Maggiolini spent most of his career at the third highest division.

== Club career ==
Born in Rome, Italian capital, Maggiolini started his career at Lodigiani.

=== Venezia ===
In 2000, Maggiolini was signed by Venezia on a co-ownership deal, but immediately loaned to Palermo. Andrea De Cecco also joined Venezia in exchange. Under the ownership of Franco Sensi, Palermo promoted. Maggiolini played 13 games for the Sicilian team. In mid-2001, he returned to Rome on loan. In June 2002 Venezia sold back the 50% registration rights of Maggiolini back to Lodigiani, as well as selling the remaining 50% registration rights of De Cecco to Lodigiani. Lodigiani submitted a higher price in tender to the FIGC arbitrator.

=== Ternana ===
In August 2002 he was sold to Serie B team Ternana but immediately loaned to Pescara of Serie C1, winning promotion as the runner-up.

=== Lanciano ===
In 2003–04 season he was sold to Lanciano on another co-ownership deal.

=== Grosseto ===
In June 2004 Ternana bought back Maggiolini by winning the tender. However he remained in the Italian third division for Grosseto, on another co-ownership deal. He finished as the losing side of promotion play-offs.

=== Ternana return ===
In June 2005 he returned to Terni as the club won another tender bidding. He failed to play any games in 2005–06 Serie B. In January 2006, he returned to Serie C1 again for Frosinone, as understudy of Giovanni Bruno, winning promotion play-offs. That season, however, Ternana relegated from the second division.

Maggiolini, along with Houssine Kharja and Luis Jiménez, they did not play any games for Ternana in 2006–07 Serie C1.

=== Later career ===
In June 2007 Maggiolini was signed by Novara of the same division. In 2009, he joined Cosenza, still belonged to Lega Pro Prima Divisione (ex-Serie C1).

On 31 August 2010 he was signed by Ravenna. Despite the team won the relegation play-out, the team was expelled by FIGC from the new season, due to failures in financial stress tests.

After Ravenna bankrupted, he joined L.P. Prima Divisione newcomer Latina in 2011.

== Honours ==
- Serie C1: 2001 (Palermo)
