= Sanjiv =

Sanjiv is a given name. Notable people with the name include:

- Sanjiv Arya, Indian politician from Uttarakhand
- Sanjiv Bajaj (born 1969), Indian businessman
- Sanjiv Bhatt (born 1963), Indian Police Service officer
- Sanjiv Bhattacharya, British journalist
- Sanjiv Chaturvedi (born 1974), Indian Forest Service officer
- Sanjiv Chaurasiya (born 1969), Indian politician from Bihar
- Sanjiv Chopra (born 1949), Indian-American physician
- Sanjiv Sam Gambhir (1962–2020), Indian-American physician
- Sanjiv Goenka (born 1961), Indian entrepreneur
- Sanjiv Gooljar (born 1982), Trinidadian cricketer
- Sanjiv Jaiswal (born 1972), Indian film director
- Sanjiv Kaul, Indian-American cardiologist
- Sanjiv Khanna (born 1960), Indian judge
- Sanjiv Kumar (disambiguation), several people
- Sanjiv Mehta (disambiguation), several people
- Sanjiv Narayan (born 1964), British-born American physician and biomedical engineer
- Sanjiv Rai, Indian computer scientist and entrepreneur
- Sanjiv N. Sahai (born 1961), Indian government administrator
- Sanjiv Saraf (born 1958), Indian entrepreneur, philanthropist, and author
- Sanjiv Sidhu (born 1957), Indian-American software entrepreneur
- Sanjiv Kumar Thakur (1977–2020), Indian Army officer

== See also ==
- Sanjay
- Sanjeev
- Sanjib
