= Satyanarayan Singh (Bihar politician, died 2020) =

Indian politician (1942–2020)

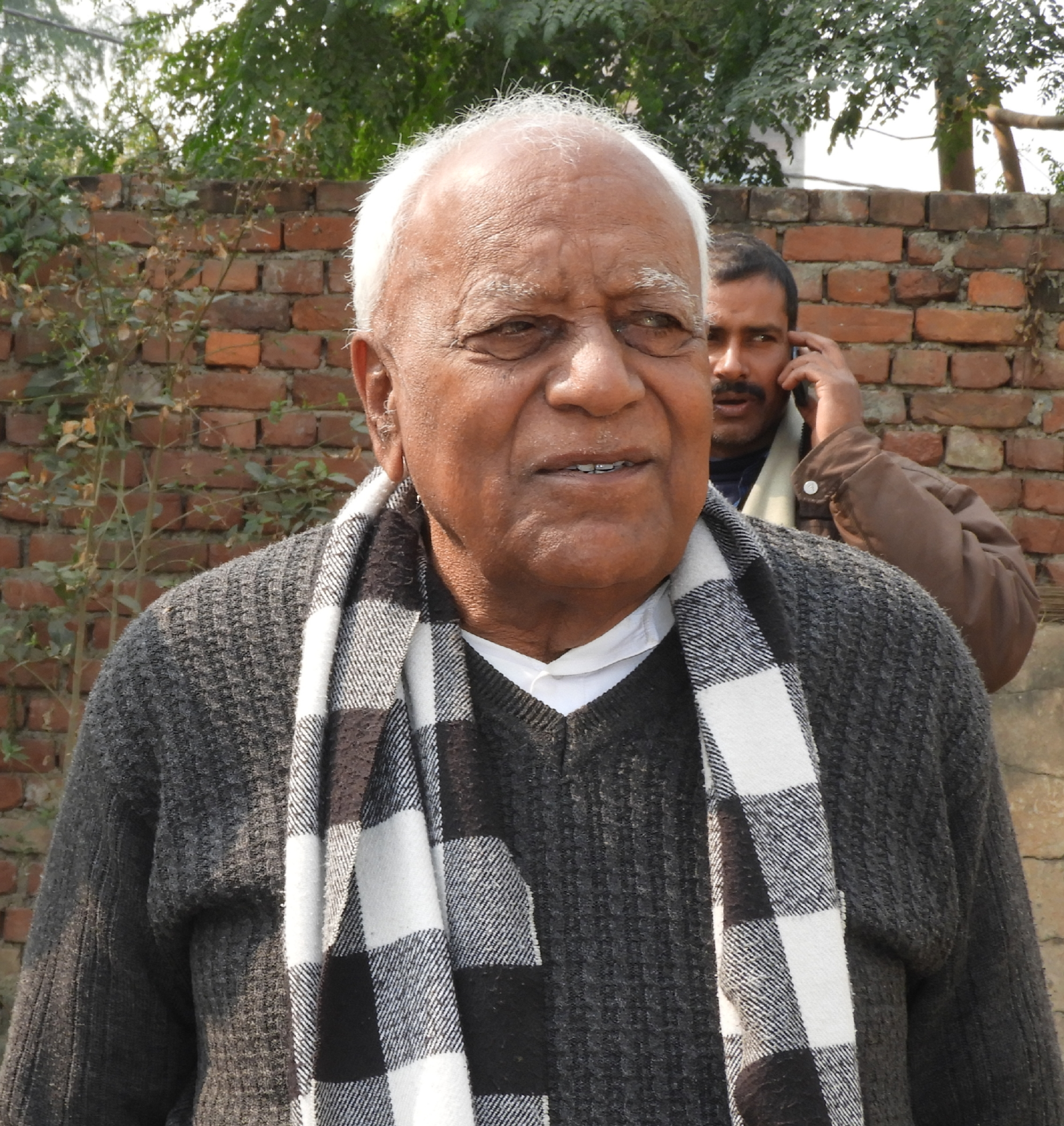
- Satyanarayan Singh in 2019

Secretary, Bihar State Council, Communist Party of India
- In office 2015–2020

Member of the Legislative Assembly
- In office 1990–2000
- Constituency: Chautham

Personal details
- Born: Kaithi, Khagaria
- Died: 2 August 2020 Patna, Bihar, India
- Party: Communist Party of India
- Children: Ankit (son), Anupam, Manisha and other two daughters
- Education: Tilka Manjhi Bhagalpur University

Satyanarayan Singh (also written Satya Narain Singh) (1942 – 2 August 2020) was a Member of the Bihar Legislative Assembly. He was elected for the Chautham constituency twice between 1990 and 2000 for the Communist Party of India. He was state secretary of the CPI's Bihar unit from 2015.

He died on 2 August 2020 from COVID-19 at AIIMS Patna during the COVID-19 pandemic in India.

== Early life and career ==
Satyanarayan Singh was born in 1942 at village Kaithi in Khagaria, Bihar to Dwarika Prasad Singh and Panchmukhi Devi. He received his primary education in the village school and secondary education at Zila school in Monghyr (present day Munger). After finishing school, he studied at T.N.B College, Bhagalpur and later undertook postgraduate studies at Bhagalpur University. Thereafter, he obtained a degree in law and took up a position as a lecturer in Jagjivan Ram College, Jamalpur, Munger. Singh returned to Khagaria to practice law but after some time resigned his lectureship and left his law practice in 1968 to join and work full time for the CPI.

== Political career ==
Singh started his political career in the All India Student Federation, the student wing of the Communist Party of India. He was elected Mukhia of his gram panchayat in the year 1969 and continued in that post for twenty years. In 1980, he was elected Pramukh of the block panchayat samiti. He was also elected an MLA on a CPI ticket in 1990 and also in 1995 for the Beldaur Vidhan Sabha Constituency. In later years, he was actively involved in Kisan Sabha and fought for the rights of peasants and workers.

== Personal life ==
He is survived by a younger son, Ankit, who is a doctor, and four daughters.
