= Rajdham =

- Village Settlement
- Location in Bihar, India Rajdham (India)
- Coordinates: 25.28°N 86.39°E
- Country: India
- State: Bihar
- District: Khagaria
- Lok Sabha Constituency: Khagaria
- Vidhan Sabha Constituency: Beldaur

Government
  - MP: Rajesh Verma
  - MLA: Panna Lal Singh Patel

Area
  - Total: 3.5 km^{2} (1.4 sq mi)
- Elevation: 37 m (121 ft)
  - Density: 600/km^{2} (1,600/sq mi)

Languages
  - Official: Angika, Hindi
- Time zone: UTC+5:30 (IST)
- PIN: 851213
- Telephone code: 916245
- ISO 3166 code: IN-BR
- Coastline: 0 kilometres (0 mi)
- Nearest city: Khagaria
- Major Highways: NH 31, NH 107

Rajdham is a village in Gogari block of Khagaria district of Bihar State, India.

== Geography ==
It is located at 25°28′0″N 86°39′0″E. Rajdham is one of the villages of Maheshkhunt Panchayat in Khagaria District, Bihar State. It is 6.5 km from its Block Gogri. It is located approximately 19 km from Khagaria and approx 155 km from Patna. The Kosi River passes through the village.

== Agriculture ==
More than half the population of Rajdham is associated with agriculture and allied sectors. Agriculture is the main source of income, and the city mostly farms maize, wheat, paddy, banana, sugarcane, and sunflowers at large scale.

== Transportation ==
Rajdham is situated at a distance of about 20 kilometres (12.4 mi) from Khagaria. It is a well connected village of Khagaria District with the main cities of Bihar. National Highway NH 107 passes through the village, which connects Maheshkhunt, NH 31 to Saharsa and Purnia. The whole village is situated on both sides of NH 107.

It is also connected to National Highway NH 31 which is 1.5 kilometres (0.9 mi) away.

1. Nearest Railway Station: Maheshkunt Railway Station, Maheshkhunt (Main route Under Barauni-Katihar-Guwahati)
2. Nearest Bus Station: Maheshkhunt Bus Stand (Connect NH31 and NH107)
3. Nearby Airport: Darbhanga Airport, Purnea Airport, Patna Airport

== Temples in Rajdham ==
1. Hardol Baba Sthan, Rajdham
2. Shiv Mandir, Rajdham
3. Bhagwati Sthan, Pachkhutti, Rajdham
4. Shiv Mandir, Dhanuk Toli, Rajdham
