= Sanjeevani =

Sanjeevani or Sanjivani may refer to:

- Sanjivani (Hinduism), a medicinal herb mentioned in the Hindu's Vedas.
- Sanjeevani (singer), Zee TV voice talent hunt reality show SaReGaMa 1995 winner and playback singer
- Sanjivani (2002 TV series), a 2002–2005 Indian Hindi-language television series
- Sanjivani (2019 TV series), a 2019 Indian Hindi-language television series

== See also ==
- Sanjiva or Sanjiv or Sanjeeva, an Indian male given name
- Sanjeewa, an alternative form of the male given name
- Sanjeevaiah (disambiguation)
