= Kulharia, Khagaria district =

Kulharia
- Village
- Kulharia
- Location of Kulharia in Bihar Kulharia (India)
- Coordinates: 25°20′00.004″N 86°45′53.179″E
- Country: India
- State: Bihar
- District: Khagaria
- Subdistrict: Parbatta

Government
  - Type: Gram Panchayat
  - Body: Kulharia Gram Panchayat
  - Mukhiya: Smt. Vibha Devi
  - Sarpanch: Smt. Shobha Devi

Area
  - Total: 4.64 km^{2} (1.79 sq mi)
- Elevation: 42 m (138 ft)

Population (2011)
  - Total: 13,024
  - Rank: 2nd in Parbatta Subdistrict
  - Density: 2,810/km^{2} (7,270/sq mi)
  - Literacy Rate: 68.18%
  - Gender Ratio: 866/1,000
- Demonym: Angika

Language
  - Official: Hindi
  - Additional official: English
  - Regional: Angika
- Time zone: UTC+5:30 (IST)
- Postal Index Number: 851216
- STD Code: 06245
- Vehicle registration: BR-34

Kulharia is a village panchayat in the Parbatta Subdistrict of Khagaria district, Bihar. It is 1 km from the bank of river Ganga and 5 km from the Subdistrict headquarter Parbatta. Maheslet More and Salarpur Chowk are the two major Bus Stops/Stands in Kulharia. Its district headquarters of Khagaria. The pin code of Kulharia is 851216.

The village has a population of 13,024 people, out of which 6,980 are male and 6,044 are female. The literacy rate of the village is 68.18%, with 73.80% of males and 61.56% of females literate. The gender ratio in the village is 866 females per 1000 males.

Angika is the language which is still widely spoken in Kulharia. The main occupation of the people of Kulharia is agriculture. Other occupations include fishing, livestock rearing, and small businesses. The village has three government primary schools including MV Kulharia school which is one of the oldest schools in the State. It was started by the Department of Education in 1918. It also has two more government middle schools, and two government high schools. The village has a post office and a bank.
