= Ramanand Prasad Singh =

Indian politician (1941–2025)

Ramanand Prasad Singh (1941 – 10 May 2025) was an Indian politician from Bihar. He was elected four times as an MLA from Parbatta Assembly constituency in Khagaria district. He won the 2015 Bihar Legislative Assembly election representing the Janata Dal (United).

== Early life and education ==
Singh was from Parbatta, Khagaria district, Bihar. He was the son of the late Arogya Singh. He completed his B.Tech. in 1967 at Leeds University, United Kingdom. His son Sanjeev Kumar is also a politician and succeeded him winning in the Parbatta Assembly constituency in 2020.

== Career ==
Singh won as an MLA for the first time in the Parbatta Assembly constituency representing Janata Dal (United) in the 2004 Bihar Legislative Assembly byelection. He later retained the seat winning the 2005 elections in February and October. He lost the 2010 election to Samrat Chaudhary of RJD by a narrow margin of 808 votes but regained it winning the 2014 byelection in August. He retained the seat winning the 2015 Bihar Legislative Assembly election. He polled 76,248 votes and defeated his nearest rival, Ramanuj Choudhary of Bharatiya Janata Party, by a margin of 28,924 votes.

In 2008, he was inducted into the Nitish Kumar ministry as Transport Minister but had to quit within a couple of months due to an old vigilance case.

== Death ==
Singh died at a hospital in Patna on 10 May 2025.
