= Sanjeevaiah =

Sanjeevaiah, Sanjeevayya or Sanjivaiah is an Indian given name and may refer to:

- Damodaram Sanjivayya, former chief minister of Andhra Pradesh, India
  - Sanjeevaiah Park railway station, a railway station in Hyderabad, Telangana, India
  - Sanjeevaiah Park, a public greenspace and park in the heart of Hyderabad, India
  - Sri Damodaram Sanjeevaiah Thermal Power Station, in Nelatur Village, near Krishnapatnam in Andhra Pradesh, India

== See also ==
- Sanjiva or Sanjiv or Sanjeeva, an Indian male given name
- Sanjeewa, an alternative form of the male given name
- Sanjeevani (disambiguation)
