= Poonam Devi Yadav =

Indian politician

Member of Bihar Legislative Assembly
- In office 2005–2020
- Preceded by: Yogendra Singh
- Succeeded by: Chhatrapati Yadav
- Constituency: Khagaria

Personal details
- Born: 5 July 1975 (age 51) Rampur Alauli, Khagaria, India
- Party: Janata Dal (United)
- Spouse: Ranveer Yadav
- Education: LLB
- Profession: Politician

Poonam Devi Yadav is an Indian politician. She was elected to the Bihar Legislative Assembly from Khagaria as the 2005 Member of Bihar Legislative Assembly as a member of the Janata Dal (United). Her husband Ranveer Yadav was also elected to Bihar Legislative Assembly from Khagaria in the 1990–1995.
