= Bedardi =

1993 Indian film by Krishankant Pandya

- Directed by: Krishankant Pandya
- Written by: Devjyoti Roy
- Story by: Dilip Shukla
- Produced by: Lawrence D'Souza; Manohar Pandya
- Starring: Ajay Devgan; Urmila Matondkar; Naseeruddin Shah; Reena Roy
- Cinematography: Kishore Kapadia
- Edited by: R. Rajendran
- Music by: Laxmikant-Pyarelal
- Release date: 12 November 1993
- Running time: 146 minutes
- Country: India
- Language: Hindi

Bedardi is a 1993 Indian Hindi-language action, romance film produced by Lawrence D'Souza and Manohar Pandya. The film is directed by Krishankant Pandya. The film stars Ajay Devgan, Urmila Matondkar, Naseeruddin Shah, Reena Roy. The film's music is by Laxmikant-Pyarelal. The film was released on 12 November 1993.

== Box office ==
Movie had lifetime worldwide gross box office collection was 5.39 Cr.

== Cast ==
- Ajay Devgan as Vijay 'Viju' Saxena
- Urmila Matondkar as Honey
- Naseeruddin Shah as Professor Nirbhay Saxena
- Reena Roy as Preeti N. Saxena
- Upasna Singh in Dance number 'Maney sote diya jagay'
- Baby Gazala as Ritu N. Saxena
- Sonia Mulay as Suman Saxena
- Kiran Kumar as Kanhaiya aka K.K. aka Kanya
- Ashok Banthia as Police Inspector
- Makrand Deshpande as Gulla
- Deven Verma as Bhagwandas
- Sanjeeva as Changeez
- Akhilendra Mishra as Akhil Mishra, College Student, Drugs Informer (Guest Appearance)

== Music ==
All lyrics are written by Anand Bakshi; all music is composed by Laxmikant-Pyarelal.

Songs
No.	Title	Playback	Length
1.	"Na Meri Zubaan Pe Tera Naam Aaya"	Alka Yagnik, Kumar Sanu
2.	"Sun O Bedardi Bedard Saiyya"	Ila Arun, Kavita Krishnamurthy
3.	"Ek Din To Honi Thi Mohabbat Ho Gayi"	Alka Yagnik, Vinod Rathod
4.	"Mane Sote Diya Jagaye Jaane Kaa Karigo"	Alka Yagnik
5.	"Bolo Main Pyar Karti Hu"	Vinod Rathod
6.	"Mai Tumse Pyar Karti Hu Mai Ye Ikraar Karti Hu"	Alka Yagnik, Vinod Rathod
7.	"Ille Ille Ille"	Vinod Rathod
