= Maheshkhunt =

Maheshkhunt Maheshkhunt(Madarpur)
- Village
- Location in Bihar, India Maheshkhunt (India)
- Coordinates: 25°27′0″N 86°38′0″E
- Country: India
- State: Bihar
- District: Khagaria

Languages
  - Official: Maithili, Hindi
- Time zone: UTC+5:30 (IST)
- PIN: 851213
- ISO 3166 code: IN-BR
- Coastline: 0 kilometres (0 mi)
- Nearest city: Begusarai
- Lok Sabha constituency: Khagaria

Maheshkhunt is a village in Khagaria district of Bihar state, India.

== Geography ==
It is located at 25°27′0″N 86°38′0″E. Maheshkhunt is one of the villages, itself a tehsil, in Khagaria District, Bihar State. Maheshkhunt is 5.5 km from its Block Gogri. Maheshkhunt is located 17.2 km from its District Main City Khagaria. It is located 153 km from its State Main City Patna

== Villages near Maheshkhunt ==
Maheshkhunt Pin Code is 851213 and Post office name is Maheshkhunt and its STD code is 06245. Other villages under Maheshkhunt Post office are Madarpur, Rajdham, Pakrail, Samaspur, Salim Nagar, Jhiktiya and Banni. Other villages in Gogri Tehsil are Baltara, Basudeopur, Borna, Deotha, Gouchhari, Itahari, Dukhatola, Ramadhintola, Patelnagar

Nearby villages with distance are Rajdham (1.5 km), Telaunchh (2.6 km), Gobindpur (2.6 km), Madarpur (2.7 km), Pipra (3.5 km), Banni (3.8 km), Ramadhintola (5.8 km),. Towns nearby are Gogri (5.5 km), Adabari(7 km), Chautham (7.2 km), Mansi (11.3 km), Beldaur (12 km). Harinagar (1.5 km)

== Education In Maheshkhunt ==
There are many good schools in and near by the village.

List Of School:

1.Chandrashekhar Singh Girls High School, Maheshkhunt

2. English School, English Tola Maheshkhunt:

3. Sardar Patel Memorial High School Rajdham Maheshkhunt:

4. Madhya Vidyalay Madarpur

5. Rajkiye madhya vidhalaya, maheshkhunt

6. ShivMurti Children's academy, maheshkhunt

7. SMCA Play School maheshkhunt

7. D.A.V Public school, Dyanand nagar, Maheshkhunt

8. Delhi Public School, Maheshkhunt

9. Raj Mathematics & Science teaching center

10. Jawahar Inter school Maheshkhunt Khagaria

11. Oxford Computer Center, Maheshkhunt

12. Lokesh Bal Vikas Mandir, Maheshkhunt

13. Golden shikshan sansthan (maheshkhunt) 14.Frontline mathematics classes 15. Global International Military School (Banni, Samaspur )

== Colleges ==
1. Inter College Pipra Nauranga Khagaria 2. Sharda Girdhari Keshri College Maheshkhunt 2. KDS College Gogari 3. Koshi college khagaria 4. DAV school

== Festivals ==
Holi, Ram Navmi (Chati Durga Puja), Durga Puja (Dashara), Diwali, Kali Puja, Eid, Bakrid, Muharram, Chath Puja, Kartik Puja, Maker Sankranti, Ganesh Chturthi, basant-panchami, Sarashwati Puja.

== Languages ==
The prominent languages spoken in this village are Angika (Theti), Hindi, Urdu and Maithili. People also understand Bhojpuri.

== Agriculture In Maheshkhunt ==
1. Maize 2. Wheat 3. Paddy 4. Banana 5. Betel leaf 6. Sugarcane 7. Sunflower 8. Others Relevant Item.

== Transportation ==
1. Maheshkunt Railway Station, Maheshkhunt (Main route Under Barauni-Katihar-Guwahati)
2. Bus Stand, Maheshkhunt (Connect NH31 and NH107)

== Location ==
National Highway 107 starts at Maheshkhunt. Nearest airport is Patna Airport.

Temples

1. Durga mandir (also known as Naulakha mandir) 2. Kartik temple (near old market) 3. Chaiti durga temple 4. Zama masjid (Salimnagar) 5. Zama masjid (Jhitkiya) 6. Shivalaya (West tola) 7. Maa bhagwati temple & mahakal shiv mandir (madarpur) 8. Maa kaali temple (Ramchandrapur) 9. Maa saraswati mandir (west tola) 10. Sarswati mandir (kajeechak) 11. Mazar salim shah salim nagar
