= Khagaria Assembly constituency =

Coordinates: 25°30′22″N 86°28′16″E

Khagaria
- Constituency No. 149 - for the Bihar Legislative Assembly

Constituency details
- Country: India
- Region: East India
- State: Bihar
- District: Khagaria
- Established: 1951
- Total electors: 261,473

Member of Legislative Assembly
- 18th Bihar Legislative Assembly
- Incumbent Bablu Mandal
- Party: JD(U)
- Alliance: NDA
- Elected year: 2025

Khagaria Assembly constituency is an assembly constituency in Khagaria district in the Indian state of Bihar. In the 2015 Bihar Legislative Assembly election, Khagaria was one of the 36 seats to have VVPAT enabled electronic voting machines.

== Overview ==
As per the Delimitation of Parliamentary and Assembly Constituencies Order, 2008, No. 149 Khagaria Assembly constituency comprises the following: Khagaria municipality; Mansi community development block; and Bhadas Dakshini, Bhadas Uttari, Kasimpur, Mathurapur, Bachhouta, Sanhouli, Ranko, Sansarpur, Gourashakti, Marar Dakshini, Marar Uttari, Rasounk, Uttar Marar, Rahimpur Uttari, Rahimpur Madhya, Rahimpur Dakshin, Labhganva and Kothia gram panchayats of Khagaria CD Block.

Khagaria Assembly constituency is part of No. 25 Khagaria (Lok Sabha constituency).

== Members of the Legislative Assembly ==
Year	Name	Party
1952	Dwarika Prasad	Indian National Congress
1957	Kedar Narayan Singh Azad	Indian National Congress
1962	Kedar Narayan Singh Azad	Indian National Congress
1967	Ram Bahadur Azad	Samyukta Socialist Party
1969	Ram Bahadur Azad	Samyukta Socialist Party
1972	Ram Sharan Yadav	Bharatiya Janata Party
1977	Ram Sharan Yadav	Independent politician
1980	Ram Sharan Yadav	Janata Party
1985	Satyadeo Singh	Indian National Congress
1990	Ranveer Yadav	Independent politician
1995	Chandramukhi Devi	Bharatiya Janata Party
2000	Yogendra Singh	Communist Party of India (Marxist)
2005	Poonam Devi Yadav	Lok Janshakti Party
2005	Poonam Devi Yadav	Janata Dal (United)
2010	Poonam Devi Yadav	Janata Dal (United)
2015	Poonam Devi Yadav	Janata Dal (United)
2020	Chhatrapati Yadav	Indian National Congress
2025	Bablu Kumar	Janata Dal (United)

== Election results ==
=== 2025 ===
Bihar Legislative Assembly Election, 2025: Khagaria
Party	Candidate	Votes	%	±%
JD(U)	Bablu Kumar	93,988	51.29	+22.14
INC	Dr. Chandan Yadav	70,573	38.51	+7.37
Independent	Manish Kumar Singh	5,507	3.01	
JSP	Jayanti Patel	4,232	2.31	
Independent	Lalan Kumar	2,545	1.39	
NOTA	None of the above	3,662	2.0	+1.43
Majority		23,415	12.78	+10.79
Turnout		183,237	70.08	+12.07
JD(U) gain from INC		Swing		

=== 2020 ===
Bihar Assembly election, 2020: Khagaria
Party	Candidate	Votes	%	±%
INC	Chhatrapati Yadav	46,980	31.14	
JD(U)	Poonam Devi Yadav	43,980	29.15	−17.28
LJP	Renu Kumari	20,719	13.73	
JAP(L)	Manohar Kumar Yadav	11,589	7.68	−1.49
Independent	Er. Dharmendra Kumar	8,529	5.65	
Independent	Gopal Krishan Kumar Chandan	3,161	2.1	
Independent	Jitendra Yadav	3,023	2.0	
RLSP	Md Faruque Ahmad	2,183	1.45	
Independent	Alka Kumari	1,450	0.96	
NOTA	None of the above	855	0.57	−2.79
Majority		3,000	1.99	−16.34
Turnout		150,857	58.01	−1.02
INC gain from JD(U)		Swing		

=== 2015 ===
Bihar Assembly election, 2015: Khagaria
Party	Candidate	Votes	%	±%
JD(U)	Poonam Devi Yadav	64,767	46.43	
HAM(S)	Rajesh Kumar Urf Rohit Kumar	39,202	28.1	
JAP(L)	Manohar Kumar Yadav	12,791	9.17	
Independent	Mukesh Kumar	3,701	2.65	
CPI(M)	Sanjay Kumar	3,508	2.51	
Independent	Gopal Krishna Kumar Chandan	3,115	2.23	
BMP	Manoj Kumar	2,155	1.54	
Independent	Birendra Kumar	1,348	0.97	
NOTA	None of the above	4,687	3.36	
Majority		25,565	18.33	
Turnout		139,501	59.03	
JD(U) hold		Swing		
