= Chorhli =

Village in Khagaria district, Bihar, India

Coordinates: 25°31′N 86°46′E

Chorhli is a village in Khagaria district in Bihar, India. As of the 2011 Census of India, it had a population of 10,644 across 2,995 households.

The village is situated on the banks of the Kosi River, which is known for frequent flooding and riverbank erosion in the region.

== Geography ==
Chodhli lies in a flood-prone area due to its proximity to the Kosi River. The village has experienced recurring soil erosion and flood-related damage over the years. In 2008, severe flooding in the Kosi basin affected settlements and agricultural land in and around the village.

== Demographics and settlement ==
According to the Census of India, Chodhli is part of Khagaria district in Bihar. The village comprises several residential hamlets (locally known as tolas), including Yadav Tola. Agriculture is the primary occupation of the residents.

== Religious sites ==
Chodhli has several places of worship serving the local community, including:

- A Shiva temple
- A Jama Mosque
- A Hanuman temple, completed in 2022

== Education ==
The village has two middle schools and a +2 level high school named Utkaramit Madhyamik Vidyalaya, Chodhli (Beldaur, Khagaria), which provides secondary education to students from the village and nearby areas.

== Economy ==
The local economy is primarily based on agriculture. The Halka Bazaar serves as a local market center for Chodhli and surrounding villages.

== See also ==
- Khagaria district
- Bihar
- Kosi River
