= Chhatrapati Yadav =

Indian politician

MLA, Bihar Legislative Assembly
- In office 2020–2025
- Preceded by: Poonam Devi Yadav
- Succeeded by: Bablu Mandal
- Constituency: Khagaria

Personal details
- Born: Patna
- Party: INC
- Parent: Rajendra Prasad Yadav (father)
- Occupation: Politics, Independent Journalist

Chhatrapati Yadav is an Indian politician from the Indian National Congress and a Member of the Bihar Legislative Assembly representing Khagaria. He got elected for the first time in the 2020 Bihar Legislative Assembly election. He is a son of a former politician, legislator and minister in the Bihar Government, Rajendra Prasad Yadav, who used to contest elections from Hasanpur legislative constituency of Bihar. He has been touring his constituency and focusing on civic and infrastructural issues.
