= Hardas Chak, Saran =

Hardas Chak Hardaschak
- City
- Hardaschak
- Bari durga mandir hardaschak

- Location in Bihar, India Hardas Chak (India)
- Coordinates: 25.5092427°N 86.4912184°E
- Country: India
- State: Bihar
- District: khagaria
- Block: Khagaria

Population (2011)
  - Total: 899
- Time zone: UTC+05:30 (IST)
- Pincode: 851205

Hardas Chak, also called Hardaschak, is a village situated in Khagaria district of Bihar state, India. The population was 899 at the 2011 Indian census.
