= Rajendra Prasad Yadav =

Rajendra Prasad Yadav may refer to:

- Rajendra Prasad Yadav (Madhepura politician), member of the Lok Sabha
- Rajendra Prasad Yadav (Atri politician), member of Bihar Legislative Assembly
- Rajendra Prasad Yadav (Hasanpur politician), member of Bihar Legislative Assembly
