= Topera Medical =

Medical technology company

Topera, Inc.
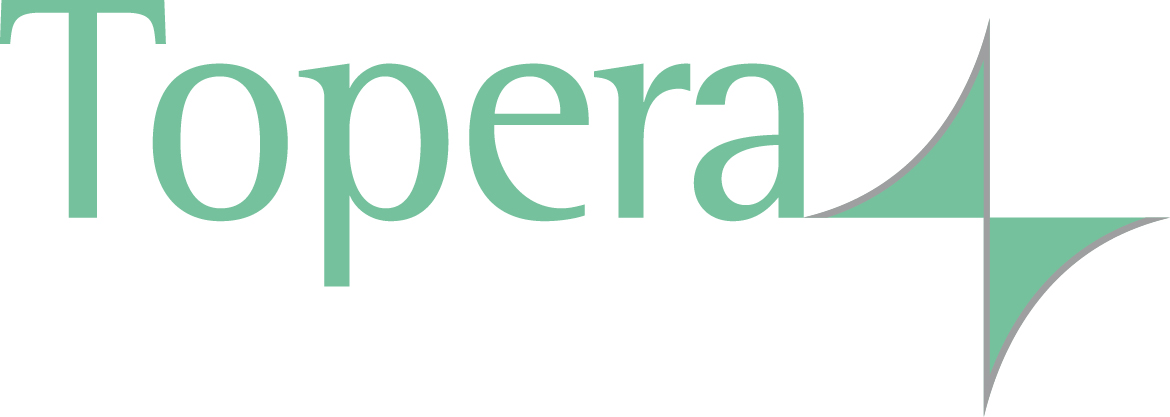
- Type: Private
- Founded: 2010; 16 years ago in San Diego, California
- Founders: Dr. Sanjiv Narayan, Ruchir Sehra
- Headquarters: Palo Alto, California
- Key people: Edward Kerslake CEO A
- Website: www.toperamedical.com

Topera, Inc. is a cardiac arrhythmia mapping company which specializes in mapping electrical signals of the heart. Topera's headquarters are located in Palo Alto, California. The company uses 3D analysis and mapping to detect the sources of atrial fibrillation, atrial flutter, and atrial tachycardia and ventricular tachycardia to identify targets for catheter ablation.

== History ==
In 2010, Dr. Sanjiv Narayan and Dr. Ruchir Sehra founded Topera in San Diego, California. Narayan started the company to commercialize the technology he developed to map irregular heartbeats. Prior to founding the company, Narayan had collected cardiac electrophysiological data from patients and written software to analyze the collected data; he had also conducted clinical studies to prove that conventional pulmonary vein isolation (PVI) plus targeting and ablating rotors and focal impulses would increase the success rate of single procedure atrial fibrillation ablations.

In 2011, Topera opened an office in Lexington, Massachusetts. Edward Kerslake, former corporate vice president of Boston Scientific, became the CEO of Topera in 2010. In 2011, the firm created a management advisory board.

In 2012, the FDA cleared Topera's 3D mapping and analysis system, RhythmView. The system was presented at the Heart Rhythm Society's 2012 scientific sessions in Boston, Massachusetts.

=== Funding ===
Topera raised $2.75 million in its seed funding round in 2012. A few months later, the company received an additional $3.77 million in partial close funding. In May 2013, the company closed on $25 million in a C series of funding led by New Enterprise Associates.

== Products ==
Topera developed a 3D mapping tool to assist physicians in identifying the electrical source of complex cardiac arrhythmias. The FIRMap catheter, used with the RhythmView workstation, received CE clearance and FDA clearance in 2013. The tip of the catheter has a spherical wire basket that has 64 evenly placed electrodes over the 8 splines that make up the basket. The basket expands, capturing the contours of the heart chambers and creating a panoramic map of the electrical heart activity. This information is sent to the workstation and creates a near real-time 3D reconstruction of the heart and its electrophysiological activity. The data from the workstation is used to help diagnose the source of atrial fibrillation, atrial flutter, and atrial tachycardia and ventricular tachycardia.

Prior to the company's FIRMap catheter being commercially available, the workstation was compatible with other multi-polar mapping catheters.

The Focal Impulse and Rotor Modulation procedure decreases procedure times and reduces re-ablation rates by targeting the source of arrhythmia.

== Clinical trials ==
Narayan and six other independent clinical investigators performed clinical trials that followed post-ablation procedure patients for a year. Published as a comprehensive study in August 2012, the trials showed that 88 percent of the patients in the trial who received the FIRM (Focal Impulse and Rotor Modulation) procedure had a successful termination or slowing of their atrial fibrillation. Long-term success was achieved in 82 percent of patients with a single FIRM procedure.

Ten centers reported that Topera's FIRM mapping system identifies patient specific sources of atrial fibrillation (rotors), and that ablation of the rotors improves treatment success with a single procedure.

A second, broader clinical study at ten centers independently confirmed the findings of the first study with a success rate of 80.5% where FIRM was used.

The first and second set of trials reported success after the patients were followed for one year. At the beginning of 2014, three-year results showed a success rate of 78% compared to the traditional PVI success rate of 39%.

Other published studies have shown that rotors are located in both atria of the heart and in locations that are not targeted and ablated in traditional procedures. Eliminating rotors increases success rates, even in patients with whom traditional techniques are less successful because of pre-existing conditions such as persistent atrial fibrillation, obstructive sleep apnea, metabolic syndrome, or body mass index.

Published studies reporting success rates with Topera's FIRM-guided ablations are based on single procedure results, while other published reports reflect the outcome of multiple ablation procedures. For this reason, it is difficult to compare relative success rates. One study reported success rates after a single, as well as those after multiple, procedures. The cumulative long-term success after a mean of 2 procedures was 63% while long-term success after single-procedure was only 29%.
