= Sanjeeva =

Sanjeeva is a given name. Notable people with the name include:

- Sanjeeva Edirimanna, Sri Lankan politician, member of the Sri Lankan parliament
- Sanjeeva Kaviratne (1969–2014), Sri Lankan politician, member of Parliament
- Sanjeeva Nayaka, Indian lichenologist
- Sanjeeva Ranatunga (born 1969), former Sri Lankan cricketer
- G. Sanjeeva Reddy a politician, artist, ex-Member of the Parliament of India
- Sangi Reddy Sanjeeva Reddy, a Non Commissioned Officer (NCO) in the Engineer Regiment of the Indian Army who posthumously received the Sena Medal, a prestigious gallantry award
- Sanjeeva Kumar Singh, Indian archery coach from Jharkhand
- Sanjeeva Uchil (died 2006), Indian Olympic football goalkeeper

== See also ==
- Sanjeeva Reddy Nagar, a residential area in Hyderabad, Telangana, India
- Sanjeev
- Sanjeevaiah (disambiguation)
- Sanjeevani (disambiguation)
- Sanjeevi
- Sanjiv
