= Gogri Jamalpur =

Gogri Jamalpur Gogri
- city
- Location in Bihar, India
- Coordinates: 25.4124°N 86.64135°E
- Country: India
- State: Bihar
- District: Khagaria

Population (2001)
  - Total: 31,093

Languages thumbnail
  - Official: Angika, Hindi
- Time zone: UTC+5:30 (IST)
- 851202: 851203

Gogri Jamalpur is a notified area in the Khagaria district in the Indian state of Bihar. It is located in northwestern India about 25 kilometers north of the Ganges River.

== Demographics ==
According to the 2011 India census, Gogri Jamalpur has a population of 37,753. Males constitute 53% of the population and females 47%. The gender ratio is 896, i.e. for every 1000 males there are 896 females. Sixty-seven percent of the population is literate, just one percent lower than neighboring Khagaria.
