= Chautham Assembly constituency =

Assembly constituency in Khagaria, Bihar, India

Coordinates: 25°32′30″N 86°39′20″E

Chautham
- Former constituency for the Bihar Legislative Assembly

Constituency details
- Country: India
- Region: East India
- State: Bihar
- District: Khagaria
- Lok Sabha constituency: Khagaria
- Abolished: 2010

Chautham Assembly constituency was an assembly constituency in the Khagaria district in the Indian state of Bihar.

== Overview ==
As a consequence of the orders of the Delimitation Commission of India, Chautham Assembly constituency ceased to exist in 2010.

It was part of the Khagaria Lok Sabha constituency.

== Members of Vidhan Sabha ==
Year	Name	Party
1957	Ghanshyam Singh	Indian National Congress
1962	Ghanshyam Singh	Indian National Congress
1967	Jagadambi Mandal	Samyukta Socialist Party
1969	Jagadambi Mandal	Samyukta Socialist Party
1972	Ghanshyam Singh	Indian National Congress
1977	Jagadambi Mandal	Independent
1980	Ghanshyam Singh	Indian National Congress (I)
1985	Kamleshwari Singh	Indian National Congress
1990	Satya Narain Singh	Communist Party of India
1995	Satya Narain Singh	Communist Party of India
2000	Panna Lal Singh Patel	Samata Party
2005	Sunita Sharma	Lok Janshakti Party
2005	Panna Lal Singh Patel	Janata Dal (United)
2010 onwards: Constituency does not exist
