= Sanjeev Kumar (politician, born 1979) =

Indian politician from Bihar

Dr. Sanjeev Kumar

Member of the Bihar Legislative Assembly
- In office 23 November 2020 – November 2025
- Preceded by: Ramanand Prasad Singh
- Succeeded by: Babulal Shorya
- Constituency: Parbatta

Personal details
- Born: 8 November 1979 (age 46) Khagaria district, Bihar, India
- Party: Rashtriya Janata Dal
- Other political affiliations: Janata Dal (United) (2005–2025)
- Relations: Ramanand Prasad Singh (father)
- Education: GSMC and KEM Hospital, Mumbai (MBBS)
- Profession: Physician, Politician

Dr. Sanjeev Kumar (born 8 November 1979) is an Indian physician and politician from Bihar. He served as a Member of the Bihar Legislative Assembly representing the Parbatta Assembly constituency in the Khagaria district from 2020 to 2025. Initially elected on a Janata Dal (United) ticket, he later joined the Rashtriya Janata Dal.

== Political career ==
=== Member of the Bihar Legislative Assembly ===
Dr. Sanjeev Kumar was elected to the Bihar Legislative Assembly from the Parbatta Assembly constituency in the 2020 Bihar Legislative Assembly election. He represented the constituency from November 2020 to November 2025.

=== Member of the Bihar Legislative Council ===
In October 2026, Kumar contested the Bihar Legislative Council election from the Patna Teachers' constituency as a Rashtriya Janata Dal candidate. He defeated Bharatiya Janata Party candidate Nawal Kishore Yadav by 1,057 votes, securing 4,487 votes against Yadav's 3,430. The result ended Yadav's five consecutive victories in the constituency.

== Early life and education ==
Kumar was born on 8 November 1979 into a political family in Bihar. His father, Ramanand Prasad Singh, was a veteran politician who represented the Parbatta constituency for five terms and previously served as the Transport Minister in the Government of Bihar.

Kumar pursued medical studies and earned his Bachelor of Medicine, Bachelor of Surgery (MBBS) degree from Seth Gordhandas Sunderdas Medical College and KEM Hospital in Mumbai. Following his medical training, he practiced as a general physician and managed diagnostic healthcare facilities in Patna prior to entering active politics.

== Political career ==
=== Bihar Legislative Assembly (2020–2025) ===
Kumar entered electoral politics representing the Janata Dal (United) (JD(U)). In the 2020 Bihar Legislative Assembly election, he contested from the Parbatta Assembly constituency, succeeding his father. In one of the closest contests in the state during that election cycle, Kumar won the seat by a margin of 951 votes, securing 77,226 votes against Digambar Prasad Tiwary of the Rashtriya Janata Dal (RJD), who received 76,275 votes.

During his tenure as an MLA, Kumar was vocal on infrastructural and local development issues in Khagaria:

- Aghwani–Sultanganj Bridge: Following recurring collapses during the construction of the four-lane bridge over the Ganges connecting Sultanganj and Aguani Ghat, Kumar repeatedly raised demands in the assembly and directly petitioned the state government for independent technical audits and penalties against construction contractors.
- Healthcare and flood management: He advocated for the construction of modern healthcare facilities in Parbatta, including the establishment of a 29-crore critical care block, and highlighted recurring issues regarding flood-embankment fortification and local topo-land rights.
- Policy positions: Despite being an MLA from the ruling alliance, Kumar was frequently critical of administrative bottlenecks and stated publicly in 2022 that the enforcement of the state's alcohol prohibition policy was encountering significant systemic failures.

=== 2025 Bihar Assembly Election ===
In October 2025, ahead of the Bihar Legislative Assembly elections, Kumar resigned from the Janata Dal (United) and joined the Rashtriya Janata Dal. He contested the 2025 election from Parbatta as the Mahagathbandhan candidate on an RJD ticket, finishing second behind Babulal Shorya of the Lok Janshakti Party (Ram Vilas).

== See also ==
- Parbatta Assembly constituency
- 2020 Bihar Legislative Assembly election
