= Nainital Assembly constituency =

Constituency of the Uttarakhand legislative assembly in India

Coordinates: 29.39°N 79.46°E

Nainital
- Constituency No. 58 for the Uttarakhand Legislative Assembly

Constituency details
- Country: India
- Region: North India
- State: Uttarakhand
- District: Nainital
- Lok Sabha constituency: Nainital–Udhamsingh Nagar
- Total electors: 109,970
- Reservation: SC

Member of Legislative Assembly
- 5th Uttarakhand Legislative Assembly
- Incumbent Sarita Arya
- Party: Bharatiya Janata Party
- Elected year: 2022

Nainital Legislative Assembly constituency is one of the seventy electoral Uttarakhand Legislative Assembly constituencies of Uttarakhand state in India. It includes Nainital area of Nainital District.

Nainital Legislative Assembly constituency is a part of Nainital-Udhamsingh Nagar (Lok Sabha constituency).

== Members of the Legislative Assembly ==
Election	Name	Party
1952	Narayan Datt Tiwari	Socialist Party
1957	Narayan Datt Tiwari	Praja Socialist Party
1962	Narayan Datt Tiwari	Praja Socialist Party
1967	P. Singh	Praja Socialist Party
1969	Dungar Singh	Indian National Congress
1974	Bal Krishna Sanwal	Indian National Congress
1977	Ram Datt Joshi	Janata Party
1980	Shivnarayan Singh Negi	Indian National Congress
1985	Kishan Singh Taragi	Indian National Congress
1989	Kishan Singh Taragi	Indian National Congress
1991	Banshidhar Bhagat	Bharatiya Janata Party
1993	Banshidhar Bhagat	Bharatiya Janata Party
1996	Banshidhar Bhagat	Bharatiya Janata Party
Major boundary changes
2002	Dr. Narayan Singh Jantwal	Uttarakhand Kranti Dal
2007	Kharak Singh Bohra	Bharatiya Janata Party
Major boundary changes
2012	Sarita Arya	Indian National Congress
2017	Sanjiv Arya	Bharatiya Janata Party
2022	Sarita Arya	Bharatiya Janata Party

== Election results ==
=== 2027 Assembly election ===
2027 Uttarakhand Legislative Assembly election: Nainital
Party	Candidate	Votes	%	±%
INC				
BJP				
NOTA	None of the above			
Majority				
Turnout				
gain from		Swing		

=== Assembly Election 2022 ===
2022 Uttarakhand Legislative Assembly election: Nainital
Party	Candidate	Votes	%	±%
BJP	Sarita Arya	31,770	52.19%	▲3.34
INC	Sanjiv Arya	23,889	39.24%	▲2.18
AAP	Hem Chandra Arya	2,789	4.58%	New
UKD	Om Prakash (Subhash Kumar)	904	1.48%	New
BSP	Rajkamal Sonkar	830	1.36%	▼0.26
NOTA	None of the above	695	1.14%	▼0.32
Margin of victory		7,881	12.95%	▲1.16
Turnout		60,877	54.98%	▼1.92
Registered electors		1,10,734		▲2.47
BJP hold		Swing	▲3.34	

=== Assembly Election 2017 ===
2017 Uttarakhand Legislative Assembly election: Nainital
Party	Candidate	Votes	%	±%
BJP	Sanjiv Arya	30,036	48.85%	▲11.42
INC	Sarita Arya	22,789	37.06%	▼12.63
Independent	Hem Chandra Arya	5,505	8.95%	New
Independent	K. L. Arya	1,035	1.68%	New
BSP	Sunder Lal Arya	997	1.62%	▼7.05
NOTA	None of the above	899	1.46%	New
Margin of victory		7,247	11.79%	▼0.48
Turnout		61,484	56.89%	▲2.37
Registered electors		1,08,069		▲14.53
BJP gain from INC		Swing	▼0.84	

=== Assembly Election 2012 ===
2012 Uttarakhand Legislative Assembly election: Nainital
Party	Candidate	Votes	%	±%
INC	Sarita Arya	25,563	49.69%	▲27.58
BJP	Hem Chandra Arya	19,255	37.43%	▲12.98
BSP	Snjay Kumar Alias Sanju	4,460	8.67%	▼3.37
Independent	Padma Arya	878	1.71%	New
UKD	Vinod Kumar	763	1.48%	▼22.24
SP	Devanand Alias Deva	503	0.98%	▲0.37
Margin of victory		6,308	12.26%	▲11.54
Turnout		51,444	54.52%	▼5.07
Registered electors		94,360		
INC gain from BJP		Swing	▲25.24	

=== Assembly Election 2007 ===
2007 Uttarakhand Legislative Assembly election: Nainital
Party	Candidate	Votes	%	±%
BJP	Kharak Singh Bohara	12,347	24.45%	▲7.38
UKD	Dr. Narayan Singh Jantwal	11,980	23.73%	▼3.02
INC	Jaya Bisht	11,164	22.11%	▲1.14
NCP	Dr. Harish Singh Bisht	6,267	12.41%	New
BSP	Mahesh Bhatt	6,079	12.04%	▼6.42
Independent	Harish Chandra	1,113	2.20%	New
BJSH	Deepak Shah	466	0.92%	New
Independent	Khushal Singh	463	0.92%	New
Jan Morcha	Zameer Ahmad	309	0.61%	New
SP	Mohan Chandra	307	0.61%	New
Margin of victory		367	0.73%	▼5.05
Turnout		50,495	59.59%	▲12.33
Registered electors		84,737		
BJP gain from UKD		Swing	▼2.29	

=== Assembly Election 2002 ===
2002 Uttaranchal Legislative Assembly election: Nainital
Party	Candidate	Votes	%	±%
UKD	Dr. Narayan Singh Jantiwal	10,864	26.74%	New
INC	Jaya Bisht	8,517	20.97%	New
BSP	Dr. Bhupal Singh Bhakuni	7,499	18.46%	New
BJP	Shanti Mehra	6,936	17.07%	New
Independent	Kishan Singh Negi	1,382	3.40%	New
Independent	Balkrishna Alias Balkishan	714	1.76%	New
Independent	Jagdish Chandra	576	1.42%	New
Independent	Mohan Chandra	559	1.38%	New
Independent	Harish Chandra	551	1.36%	New
Independent	Dinesh	539	1.33%	New
Independent	Pushpa Katoch	481	1.18%	New
Margin of victory		2,347	5.78%	
Turnout		40,623	47.26%	
Registered electors		85,959		
UKD win (new seat)				
