= Sanjit =

Sanjit may refer to:

- Sanjit Acharya (1953–2024), Bangladeshi singer, composer, playwright, and lyricist
- Sanjit Biswas (born 1982), co-founder of Meraki, Inc
- Sanjit Narwekar (born 1952), documentary filmmaker and author
- Sanjit De Silva (born 1976), Sri Lankan actor and director
- Sanjit Roy, also known as Sanjit 'Bunker' Roy (born 1945), Indian social activist and educator

== See also ==
- Sanjib
