= Panna Lal Singh Patel =

Indian politician (born 1948)

Panna Lal Singh Patel (born 15 August 1948) is an Indian politician from Bihar. He is a four time MLA in the Bihar Legislative Assembly. He won Chautham in 2000 and later three times from Beldaur Assembly constituency in Khagaria district. He won the 2020 Bihar Legislative Assembly election representing the Janata Dal (United).

== Early life and education ==
Patel is from Beldaur, Khagaria district, Bihar. His father Chandra Kishor Singh Patel was a farmer. He passed Class 10 in 1967 at Government High School, Pansalwa.

== Career ==
Patel became an MLA for the first time winning the Chautham Assembly constituency representing Samata Party in 2000. He later won from Beldaur Assembly constituency representing Janata Dal (United) in the 2010 Bihar Legislative Assembly election. He retained the seat for Janata Dal (U) in the 2015 and 2020 Assembly elections.
