= Gajendra Prasad Himanshu =

Indian politician

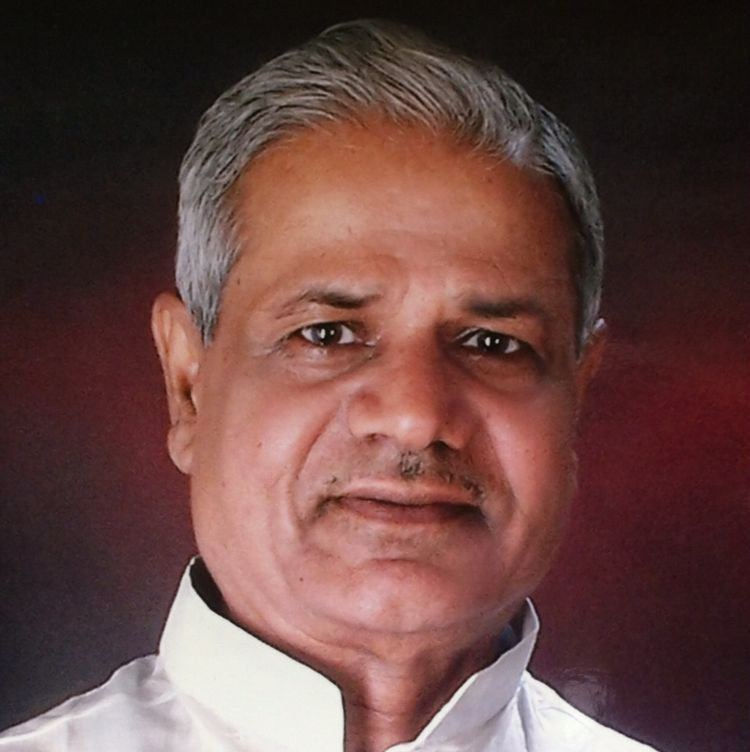

Former Deputy Speaker, Bihar Legislative Assembly
- In office 1967–2005
- Preceded by: Mahavir Raut
- Succeeded by: Rajendra Prasad Yadav
- Constituency: Hasanpur

Personal details
- Born: 10 January 1942 (age 84) Paridah, Samastipur, Bihar
- Party: Janata Dal (United); Janata Party; Samyukta Socialist Party
- Spouse(s): Veenapani, Retired Principal - Miller Inter School, Patna, Bihar, India
- Children: 2 Sons and 2 Daughters: Chakrapani Himanshu; Sushma Himanshu; Deepali Himanshu; Shastrapani Himanshu
- Education: M.A., L.L.B.
- As of 9 July, 2008 Source: Election Commission of India

Gajendra Prasad Himanshu (born 10 January 1942) is an Indian former politician. He served as the Deputy Speaker of the Bihar Legislative Assembly, twice as a minister in the Bihar government, and seven times. Seven times as an MLA from Hasanpur, Bihar.

In year 1977, he became Minister of State irrigation, Government of Bihar. He was Deputy Speaker of Bihar Legislative Assembly from 1980 to 1985. In 1990, he became Cabinet Minister of Public Health and Engineering Department (PHED), Bihar.

He was nominated as Speaker of Bihar Assembly in year 2000, by Janata Dal (United) Government. However, the nomination was withdrawn last minute to retain the sanctity of the House particularly that of the chair's post and would not like to contest the election just to create a precedence.

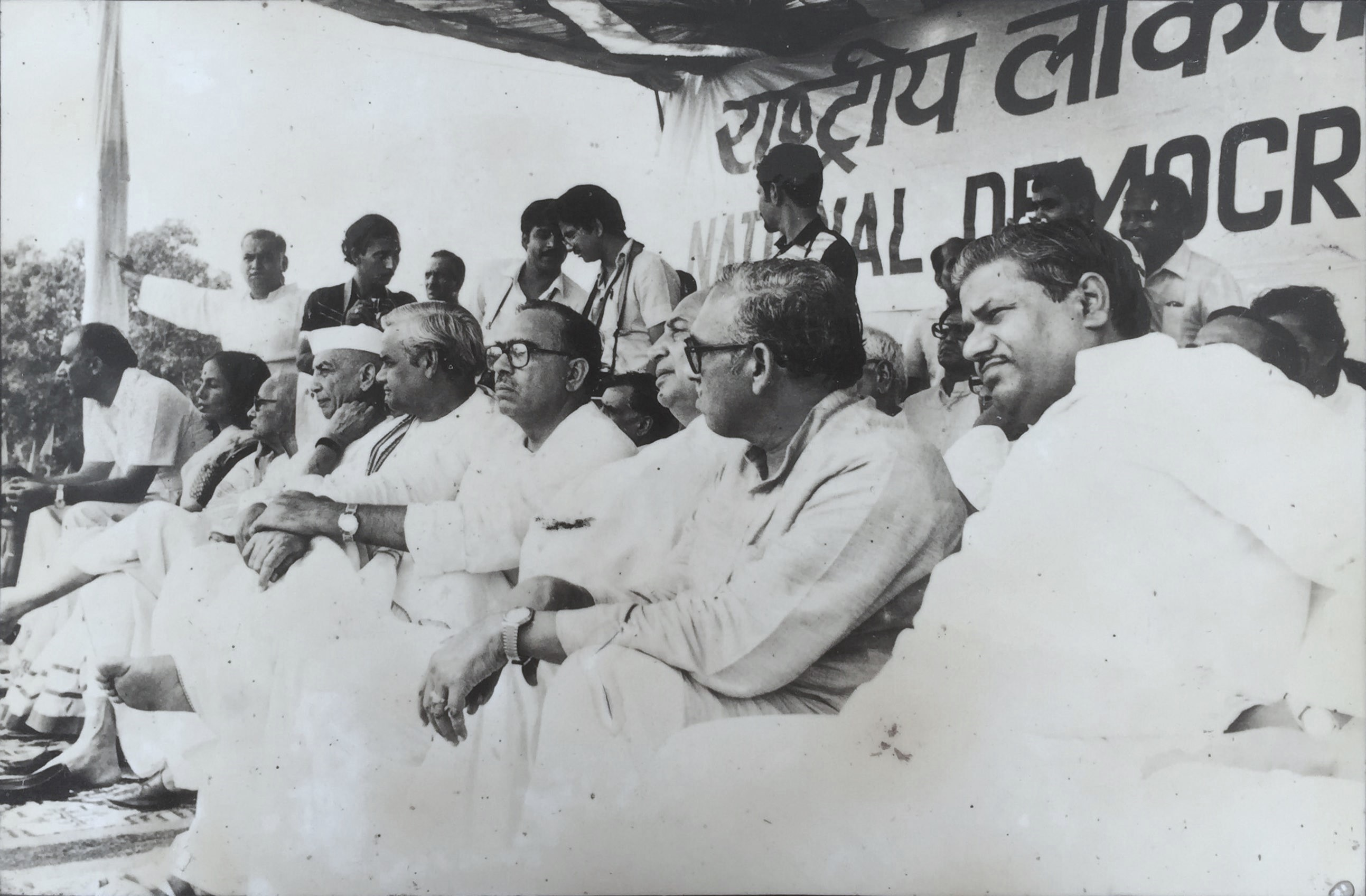
Sharing stage with Ex PMs Atal Bihari Bajpayee & Chaudhary Charan Singh

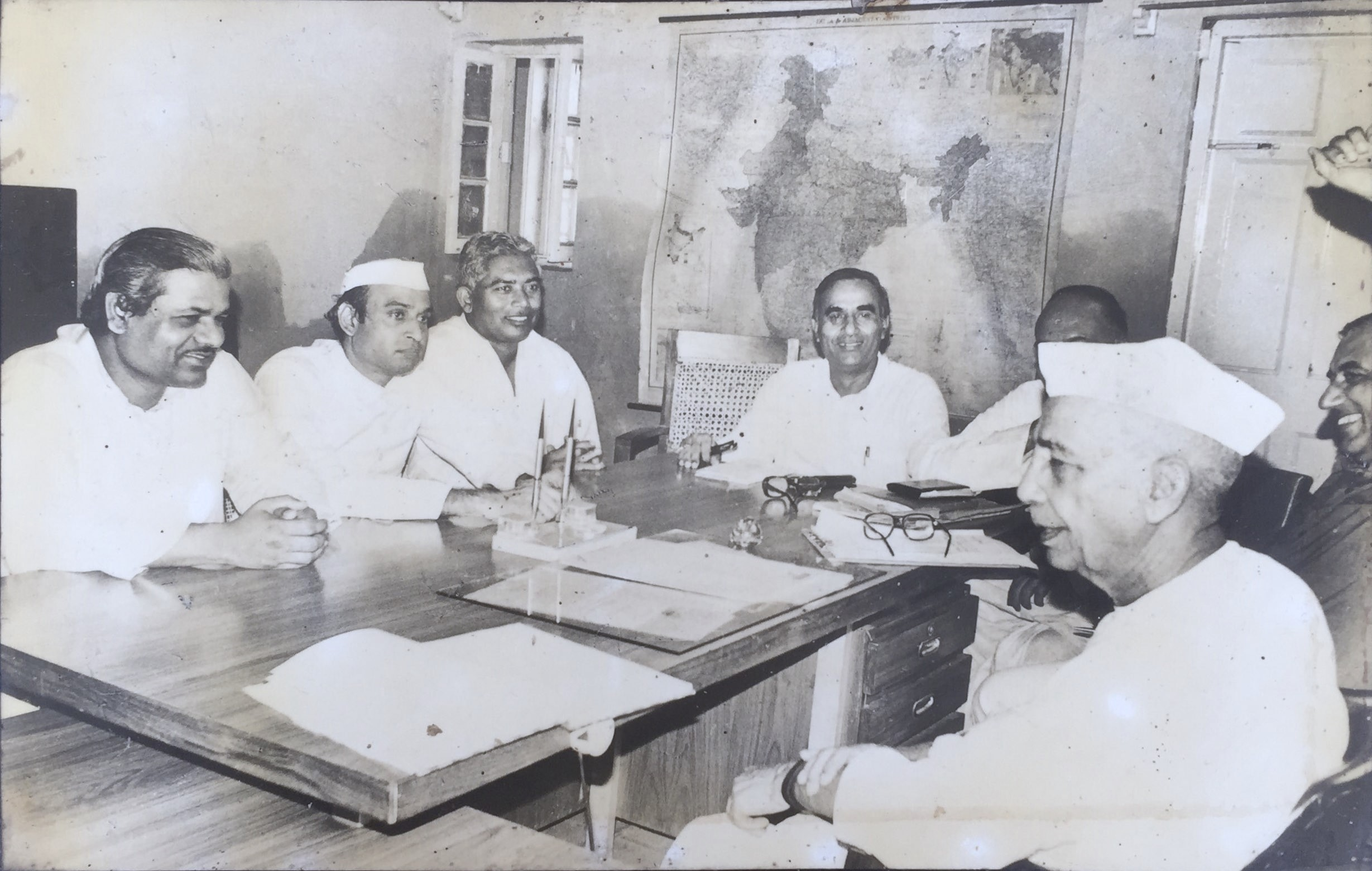
With Prime Minister Chaudhari Charan Singh

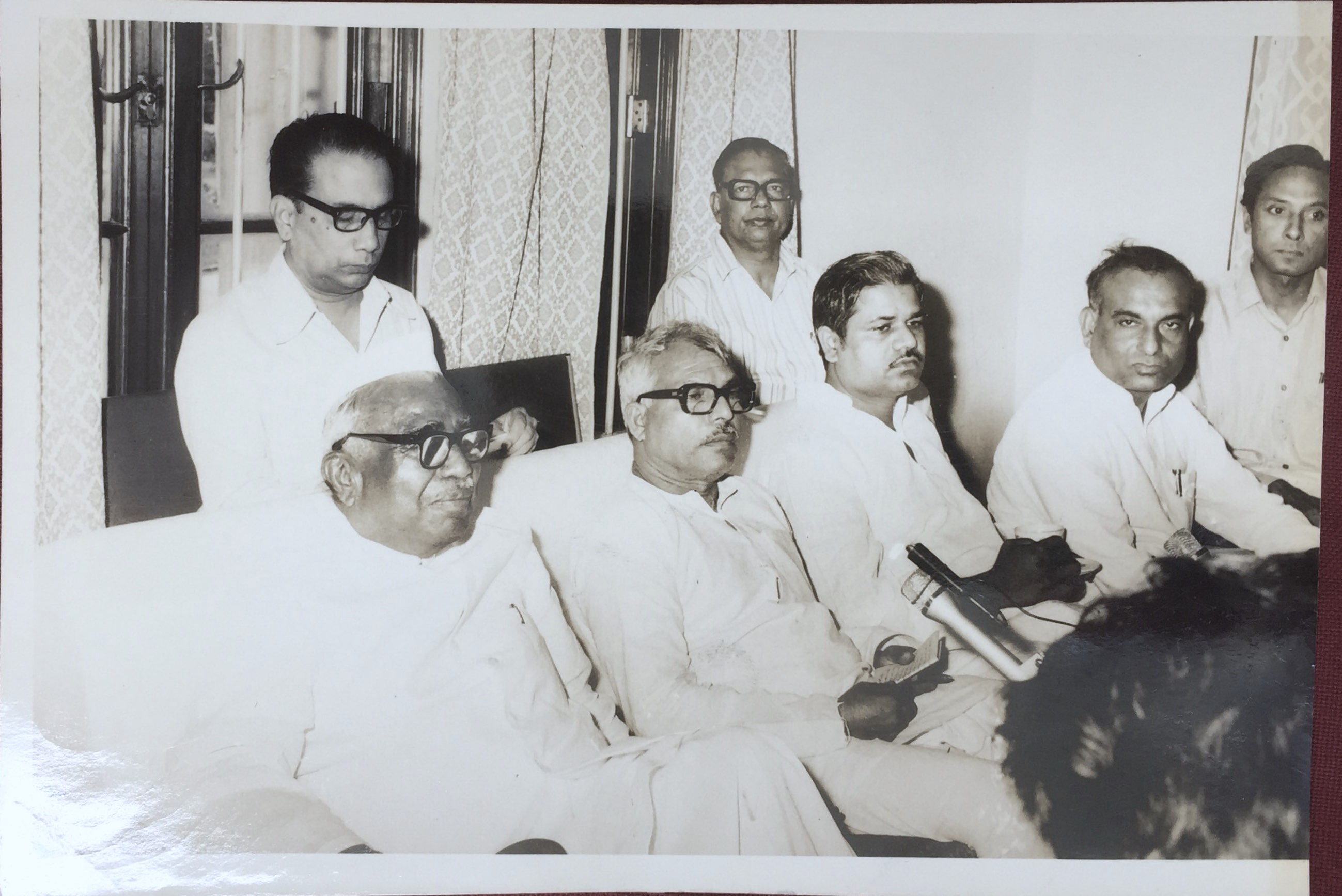
With Babu Jagjivan Ram & Ex. CM Karpoori Thakur

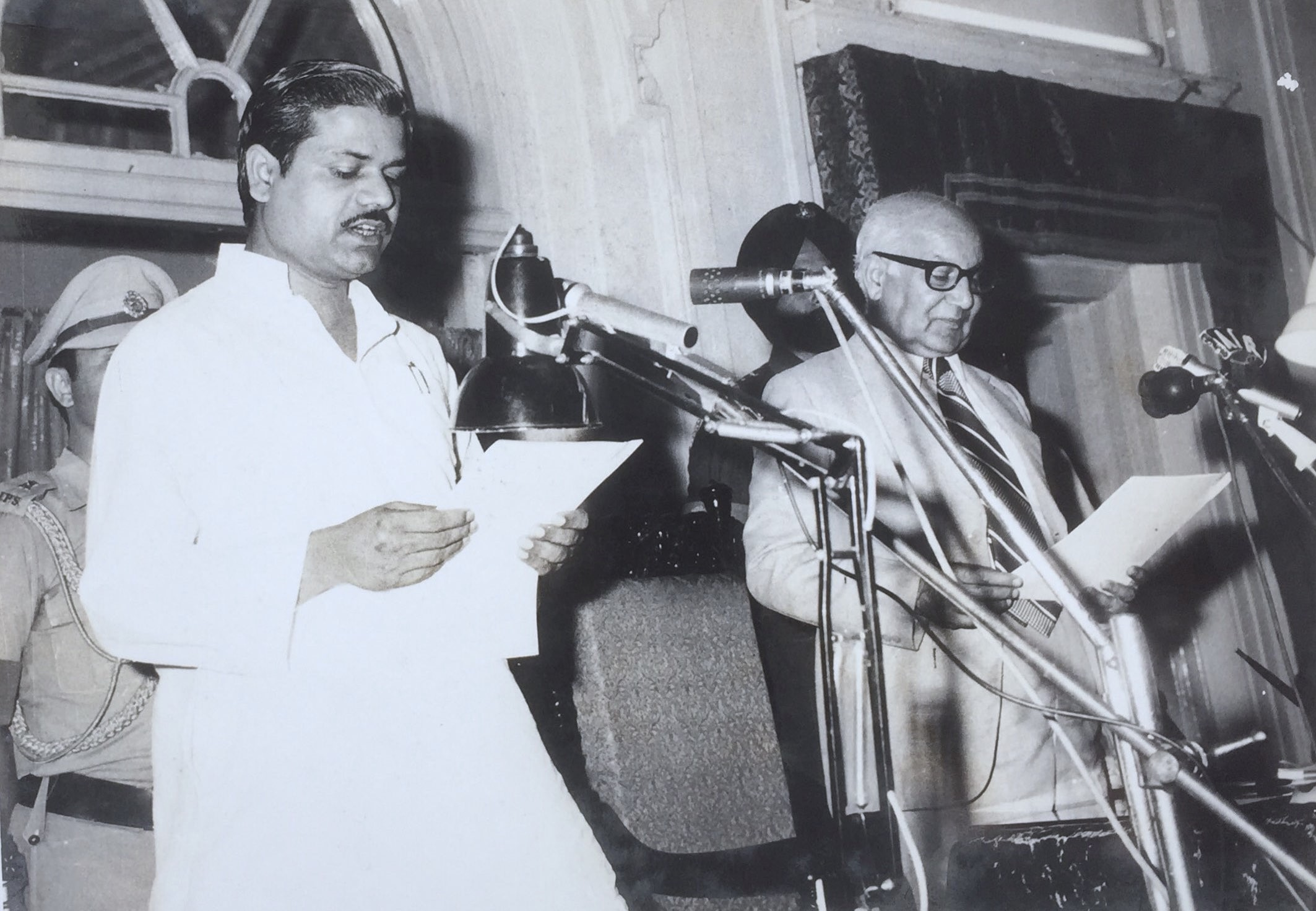
Taking oath as State Minister Bihar
