= Raj Kumar Ray =

Indian politician

Member of the Bihar Legislative Assembly
- Incumbent
- Assumed office 2025
- Preceded by: Tej Pratap Yadav
- Constituency: Hasanpur
- In office 2010–2020
- Preceded by: Sunil Kumar Pushpam
- Succeeded by: Tej Pratap Yadav
- Constituency: Hasanpur

Personal details
- Born: 11 February 1972 (age 54) Belsandi Bithan Samastipur district, Bihar, India
- Party: Janata Dal (United)
- Profession: Politician

Raj Kumar Ray or Raj Kumar Yadav is an Indian politician. He was MLA of Bihar Legislative Assembly from Hasanpur as a member of the Janata Dal (United).
