= Sanjiv Arya =

Indian politician

Member of Uttarakhand Legislative Assembly
- In office 2017–2022
- Preceded by: Sarita Arya
- Succeeded by: Sarita Arya
- Constituency: Nainital

Personal details
- Party: Indian National Congress (2021–present)
- Other political affiliations: Bharatiya Janata Party (until 2021)
- Parent: Yashpal Arya
- Education: B.Com M.B.A

Sanjiv Arya is an Indian politician. A member of Indian National Congress, he represented Nainital as a member of the Bharatiya Janata Party in the 4th Uttarakhand Assembly.

He is the son of the former Uttarakhand assembly speaker Yashpal Arya. The father-son duo joined BJP a month ahead of the 2017 assembly elections in Uttarakhand in the presence of the then BJP National President Amit Shah.

On 11 October 2021, Sanjeev and his father joined the INC in the presence of party leaders Harish Rawat, Randeep Surjewala and KC Venugopal in Delhi.

He lost from Nainital Assembly constituency in 2022 as an Indian National Congress to Bharatiya Janata Party candidate Sarita Arya.
