= Sanjeev Kumar (disambiguation) =

Sanjeev Kumar (1938–1985) was an Indian actor.

Sanjiv Kumar or Sanjeev Kumar may also refer to:

- Sanjeev Kumar (field hockey) (born 1969), Indian Olympic hockey player
- Sanjeev Kumar (Andhra Pradesh politician)
- Sanjiv Kumar (Jharkhand politician), politician from Jharkhand Mukti Morcha in Jharkhand, India
- Sanjiv Kumar (Uttar Pradesh politician), politician from Bharatiya Janata Party in Uttar Pradesh, India
- Sanjeev Kumar (politician, born 1979), politician from Bihar, India
- Sanjiv Kumar (soldier), Indian Army soldier

== See also ==
- Sanjeev Kumar Auditorium, in Surat, India, named after the actor
