= Babulal Shorya =

Indian politician (born 1987)

Member of the Bihar Legislative Assembly
- Incumbent
- Assumed office 14 November 2025
- Preceded by: Sanjeev Kumar, JD(U)
- Constituency: Parbatta

Personal details
- Born: 30 July 1987 (age 38) Khagaria, Bihar
- Party: Lok Janshakti Party (Ram Vilas)
- Spouse: Kumari Shweta
- Children: Sarvwin, Himnish
- Parent: Om Tatsat Kumar (father)
- Education: B. Ed, Raj Mata Madhuri Devi Teacher Training College, Khagaria

Babulal Shorya (born 30 July 1987), also known as Aditya Kumar Shorya, is an Indian politician from Bihar. He is the current Member of the Bihar Legislative Assembly representing the Parbatta seat. He won the 2025 Bihar Legislative Assembly election defeating Sanjeev Kumar of Rashtriya Janata Dal by 34,039 votes, securing a total of 118,677 votes.

== Early life and education ==
Babulal Shorya was born in Khagaria, Bihar. His father is Om Tatsat Kumar. He completed his B.Ed from Raj Mata Madhuri Devi Teacher Training College, Khagaria.

== Personal life ==
He is married to Kumari Shweta and has two sons, Sarvwin and Himanshu.

== Political career ==
Babulal Shorya is a member of the Lok Janshakti Party (Ram Vilas). He contested and won the 2025 Bihar Legislative Assembly election from Parbatta.

He has previously been active in local politics in Khagaria and surrounding areas.

== Electoral performance ==
Year	Constituency	Party	Votes	Result	Position
2020	Parbatta	LJP	11,576	Lost	3rd
2025	Parbatta	LJPR	118,677	Won	1st
