= Sanjeev Arora =

Sanjeev Arora may refer to:

- Sanjeev Arora (computer scientist), theoretical computer scientist
- Sanjeev Arora (politician) from India
- Sanjeev Arora (physician) from USA
