= Parbatta =

- Village
- Parbatta
- Location of Parbatta in Bihar Parbatta (India)
- Coordinates: 25°18′59″N 86°43′12″E
- Country: India
- State: Bihar
- District: Khagaria
- Subdistrict: Parbatta

Government
  - Type: Nagar Panchayat
  - Body: Parbatta Nagar Panchayat
- Elevation: 42 m (138 ft)
- Demonym: Angika

Language
  - Official: Hindi
  - Additional official: English
  - Regional: Angika
- Time zone: UTC+5:30 (IST)
- Postal Index Number: 851216 - 85XXXX
- STD Code: 06245
- Vehicle registration: BR-34
- Website: khagaria.nic.in

Parbatta is a village in the Khagaria district of Bihar state, India, 5 km from the bank of river Ganga. It also serves as the headquarters of Parbatta Assembly constituency and Parbatta Subdistrict as Parbatta CD Block. The Ganga river is home to the Gangetic dolphin, the National Aquatic Animal of India.

According to a 2015 census, Parbatta has a total of 296 households, having 1,539 people, and a literacy rate of 71.99%.

== Education ==
- K.M.D. College, Parbatta
- Patliputra Central School, Parbatta
- S.S. Public School, Parbatta
- Ganga Koshi Public School, Parbatta
- SL D.A.V., Parbatta
- St. Mary English School, Parbatta
- St.Columbus school, Parbatta
- P.V.S., Parbatta
- Dream Galaxy School, Parbatta
- Moon Residential Public School, Maraiya, Parbatta

Other primary, middle, and high schools are also run by the Government of Bihar and the Government of India for formal education.
