= Sanjib =

Sanjib is a given name, which may refer to:

- Sanjib Chandra Chattopadhyay (1838-1899), Bengali novelist and short story writer
- Sanjib Chattopadhyay (born 1936), Bengali novelist and short story writer
- Sanjib Dey, Indian director of III Smoking Barrels
- Sanjib Sanyal, Indian former cricketer
- Sanjib Sardar, Indian politician
- Sanjib Sarkar, Indian sound designer and composer
- Sanjib Senapati, Indian biophysicist, biochemist, biotechnologist

== See also ==
- Sanjit
