= Yogendra Singh Kushwaha =

Indian politician

Member of Bihar Legislative Assembly (2000-05)
- Constituency: Khagaria Assembly constituency

Personal details
- Party: Communist Party of India (Marxist)
- Occupation: Politics

Yogendra Singh is an Indian politician from Bihar, who served as member of Bihar Legislative Assembly from Khagaria Assembly constituency. Singh is a veteran leader of Communist Party of India (Marxist). He represented Khagaria Assembly constituency in Bihar Legislative Assembly from 2000 to 2005 by winning the assembly elections of 2000.

== Life and career ==
Singh represented Khagaria in Bihar Assembly in between 2000 and 2005. His elder son Sanjay Kumar Kushwaha served as district unit president of Communist Party of India (Marxist) for Khagaria district, while his younger son Ajay Kumar Kushwaha won the election to Bihar Legislative Assembly in 2020 from Bibhutipur Assembly constituency. His elder son Sanjay Kumar Kushwaha was made the candidate of CPI (M) for the 2024 Indian general election in Bihar from Khagaria Lok Sabha constituency. As MLA he always participated in welfare activities in his constituency which included distribution of amount sanctioned by the government for the beneficiaries.
