= Sanjeev =

Sanjeev may refer to:

== Given name ==
- Sanjeev Abhyankar, Hindustani classical vocalist
- Sanjeev Arora (disambiguation)
- Sanjeev Bhaskar, British Indian comedian
- Sanjeev Chattopadhyay, fiction writer
- Sanjeev Chimmalgi, Hindustani vocalist
- Sanjeev Kapoor, Indian chef
- Sanjeev Karthick, Indian Tamil actor
- Sanjeev Kohli, Scottish Asian comedian
- Sanjeev Kumar, Indian actor
- Sanjeev Manohar, Indian-American politician
- Sanjeev Naik, Mayor of Navi Mumbai
- Sanjeev Nanda, Indian businessman
- Sanjeev Raja, Indian politician
- Sanjeev Rajput, Indian shooter
- Sanjeev Rathod, Indian music director
- Sanjeev Sharma, former cricketer
- Sanjeev Tyagi, Indian actor
- Sanjeev Venkat, Indian Tamil actor

== Surname ==
- Sudeep Sanjeev, Indian actor

== Other uses ==
- Sanjeev (film), a 2026 Telugu-language drama film
