= Parbatta Assembly constituency =

Assembly constituency in Bihar, India

Parbatta
- Constituency No. 151 for the Bihar Legislative Assembly

Constituency details
- Country: India
- Region: East India
- State: Bihar
- District: Khagaria
- Lok Sabha constituency: Khagaria
- Established: 1951
- Total electors: 317,609

Member of Legislative Assembly
- 18th Bihar Legislative Assembly
- Incumbent Babulal Shorya
- Party: LJP(RV)
- Alliance: NDA
- Elected year: 2025
- Preceded by: Dr. Sanjeev Kumar, JD(U)

Parbatta Assembly constituency is an assembly constituency in Khagaria district in the Indian state of Bihar.

== Overview ==
As per Delimitation of Parliamentary and Assembly constituencies Order, 2008, No. 151 Parbatta Assembly constituency is composed of the following: Parbatta community development block; Ratan, Gogri, Jamalpur North, Jamalpur South, Rampur, Muskipur, Pasraha, Basudeopur, Itahari, Sherchakla, Paikant, Deotha, Gauchhari, Madarpur gram panchayats and Gogri Jamalpur notofoed area of Gogri CD Block.

Parbatta Assembly constituency is part of No. 25 Khagaria (Lok Sabha constituency).

== Members of Legislative assembly ==
Year	Name	Party
1952	Triveni Kumar	Socialist Party
1957	Lakshmi Devi	Indian National Congress
1962	Lakshmi Devi	Indian National Congress
1964^	S. C. Mishra	Indian National Congress
1967	Satish Prasad Singh	Samyukta Socialist Party
1969	Jagdamb Prasad Mandal	Indian National Congress
1972	Shivkant Mishra	Indian National Congress
1977	Nayeem Akhtar	Independent
1980	Ram Chandra Mishra	Indian National Congress (I)
1985	Ram Chandra Mishra	Indian National Congress
1990	Vidya Sagar Nishad	Janata Dal
1995	Vidya Sagar Nishad	Janata Dal
2000	Samrat Chaudhary	Rashtriya Janata Dal
2004^	Ramanand Prasad Singh	Janata Dal (United)
2005	Ramanand Prasad Singh	Janata Dal (United)
2005	Ramanand Prasad Singh	Janata Dal (United)
2010	Samrat Chaudhary	Rashtriya Janata Dal
2014^	Ramanand Prasad Singh	Janata Dal (United)
2015	Ramanand Prasad Singh	Janata Dal (United)
2020	Sanjeev Kumar	Janata Dal (United)
2025	Babulal Shorya	Lok Janshakti Party (Ram Vilas)

^by-election

== Election results ==
=== 2025 ===
Bihar Legislative Assembly Election, 2025: Parbatta
Party	Candidate	Votes	%	±%
LJP(RV)	Babulal Shorya	118,677	55.18	
RJD	Dr. Sanjeev Kumar	84,638	39.36	−1.74
JSP	Vinay K Varun	3,196	1.49	
Rashtriya Jansambhavna Party	Naresh Prasad Singh	2,224	1.03	
NOTA	None of the above	4,543	2.11	+1.07
Majority		34,039	15.82	+15.31
Turnout		215,055	67.71	+7.47
LJP(RV) gain from JD(U)		Swing		

=== 2020 ===
Bihar Assembly election, 2020: Parbatta
Party	Candidate	Votes	%	±%
JD(U)	Sanjeev Kumar	77,226	41.61	−3.45
RJD	Digambar Prasad Tiwary	76,275	41.1	
LJP	Aditya Kumar Shyour	11,576	6.24	
Independent	Priyadarshee Dinkar	3,596	1.94	
Independent	Babulal Shrma	3,393	1.83	
JAP(L)	Navin Kumar	3,298	1.78	−11.89
RLSP	Angad Kumar Kushwaha	2,761	1.49	
NOTA	None of the above	1,923	1.04	−2.48
Majority		951	0.51	−16.58
Turnout		185,576	60.24	+1.11
JD(U) hold		Swing		

=== 2015 ===
Bihar Assembly election, 2015: Partatta
Party	Candidate	Votes	%	±%
JD(U)	Ramanand Prasad Singh	76,248	45.06	
BJP	Ramanuj Chaudhary	47,324	27.97	
JAP(L)	Suheli Mehta	23,137	13.67	
CPI(M)	Hareram Choudhari	3,439	2.03	
Independent	Satish Prasad Singh	2,572	1.52	
Rashtriya Ahinsa Manch	Ranjeet Kumar Roushan	2,002	1.18	
Aap Aur Hum Party	Rakesh Kumar	1,592	0.94	
NOTA	None of the above	5,951	3.52	
Majority		28,924	17.09	
Turnout		169,225	59.13	
JD(U) gain from RJD		Swing		

=== 2014 (by-election) ===
2014 (by-election)
Party	Candidate	Votes	%	±%
JD(U)	Ramanand Prasad Singh	94,374	63.54	
LJP	Suheli	37,384	25.17	
CPI(M)	Hare Ram	4,735	3.19	
SP	Rakesh Kumar	1,671	1.12	
NOTA	None of the above	3,095	2.08	
Majority		56,990	38.37	{{{change}}}
Turnout		148,543		{{{change}}}
JD(U) hold		Swing	{{{swing}}}	

=== 2010 ===
Bihar Assembly election, 2010: Parbatta
Party	Candidate	Votes	%	±%
RJD	Samrat Choudhary	60,428	42.81	
JD(U)	Ramanand Prasad Singh	59,620	42.24	
INC	Naresh Prasad Badal	10,385	7.36	
Independent	Satish Prasad Singh	2,796	1.98	
BSP	Subhash Mandal	2,210	1.57	
Independent	Rakesh Kumar	2,108	1.49	
Independent	Shiv Kumar Mishra	1,327	0.94	
Independent	Dhurub Kumar Sharma	1,125	0.80	
PSS (India)	Manoj Kumar Singh	635	0.45	
RPP (India)	Chandan Kumar	528	0.37	
Majority		808	0.57	{{{change}}}
Turnout		140,949	59.06	{{{change}}}
RJD gain from JD(U)		Swing	{{{swing}}}	

=== 2005(October) ===
Bihar Assembly election, 2005 (October): Parbatta
Party	Candidate	Votes	%	±%
JD(U)	Ramanand Prasad Singh	45,684	44.16%	
Independent	Rajesh Kumar	41,539	40.16%	
LJP	Paramanand Choudhary	4,004	3.87%	
Independent	Birendra Kumar Choudhary	2,623	2.53%	
Independent	Shiv Kumar Mishra	2,540	2.45%	
Independent	Prabhat Kumar	2,354	2.27%	
ABJS	Janardan Pandit	1,562	1.51%	
BSP	Prem Kumar	1,055	1.02%	
SP	Sunil Kumar	947	0.92%	
PTSS	Tej Bahadur Singh	601	0.58%	
Independent	Dhruv Kumar Sharma	527	0.51%	
Majority		4,145	4%	{{{change}}}
Turnout		103,436		{{{change}}}

=== 2005(February) ===
Bihar Assembly election, 2005: Parbatta
Party	Candidate	Votes	%	±%
JD(U)	Ramanand Prasad Singh	47,932	44.60%	
RJD	Rakesh Kumar	46,014	42.82%	
INC	Sushil Kumar	3,385	3.15%	
BSP	Prem Kumar	2,368	2.20%	
Independent	Shiv Kumar Mishra	2,071		
Independent	Bullet Kumar Roy	1,414		
Rashtriya Samata Dal	Sushil Chandra Singh	1,203		
Independent	Birendra Kumar Choudhary	836		
Independent	Rajendra Yadav	701		
SP	Naresh Kumar Yadav	637		
Independent	Krishnadas Choudhary	483		
Independent	Abhi Nandan Kumar	407		
Majority		1,918	1.78	{{{change}}}
Turnout		107,541		{{{change}}}
JD(U) gain from RJD		Swing	{{{swing}}}	

=== 2004 By-election ===
Bihar Assembly election, 2004: Parbatta
Party	Candidate	Votes	%	±%
JD(U)	Ramanand Prasad Singh	54,229	44.69	
RJD	Rakesh Kumar	43,095	35.51	

=== 2000 ===
Bihar Assembly election 2000: Parbatta
Party	Candidate	Votes	%	±%
RJD	Rakesh Kumar (Samrat Choudhary)	48,202	34.69	
Independent	Ramanand Prasad Singh	35425	25.49	
JD(U)	Md. Faizan Alam	21446	15.43	
CPI	Jagdeo Prasad Tiwary	14053	10.11	
SP	Parmanand Choudhary	8871	6.38	
INC	Sayadeo Mishra	7168	5.16	
Majority		12,777	9.2%	
Turnout		1,38,962	75.79%	
RJD gain from JD		Swing		
