= Sanjiv Mehta =

Sanjiv Mehta may refer to:

- Sanjiv Mehta (Indian businessman), Chairman & Managing Director of Hindustan Unilever Limited (Unilever's Indian subsidiary)
- Sanjiv Mehta (British businessman), founder of The East India Company established in 2010
