= Sanjiv Kaul =

Indian-American cardiologist

- Occupations: Physician-scientist and cardiologist

Academic background
- Education: MBBS
- Alma mater: University of Delhi

Academic work
- Institutions: University of Virginia; Oregon Health and Science University; Vasocardea

Sanjiv Kaul is an Indian American physician-scientist and cardiologist. He is the Ernest C. Swigert Chair of Cardiovascular Medicine and Professor of Medicine and Radiology at the Oregon Health and Science University (OHSU), as well as the founder of Vasocardea, a company developing drugs for small vessel disease and an OHSU spin-off. Most of his work on myocardial contrast echocardiography was conducted at the University of Virginia (UVA), while his research on pericytes and GPR39 was carried out at OHSU.

Kaul is most known for his research in cardiovascular imaging and coronary artery disease, focusing on coronary physiology and pathophysiology in animal models and humans, and he holds multiple patents for his work. His publications comprise over 400 papers with a Scopus H-index of 92 and more than 36,000 citations. He has received honors, including being named among the Castle Connolly Top Doctors in America since 2003, and receiving awards, such as the Established Investigator Award from the American Heart Association in 1992, the Outstanding Investigator Award from the American Federation for Clinical Research in 1995, the first Richard Popp Gifted Teacher Award from the American Society of Echocardiography in 2001, the American Heart Association Women in Cardiology Mentoring Award in 2003, the Distinguished Scientist Award from the American College of Cardiology in 2012, and the American Heart Association's James B. Herrick Award in 2015.

Kaul is a member of the American Society for Clinical Investigation, the Association of American Physicians, and the Association of University Cardiologists.

== Education ==
Kaul earned a medical degree from Maulana Azad Medical College, University of Delhi, in 1975, before emigrating to the United States in 1977. He completed a residency in internal medicine at the University of Vermont, followed by a clinical cardiology fellowship at the Wadsworth Veterans Administration Hospital, University of California, Los Angeles. He then received additional clinical and research training in cardiovascular imaging at the Massachusetts General Hospital, Harvard Medical School.

== Career ==
Kaul began his academic career as an Assistant Professor of medicine at the University of Virginia in 1984 and became a full Professor in 1993, before being named the Frances Myers Ball Professor of Cardiology in 1997. In 2005, he joined Oregon Health & Science University (OHSU) as Chief of Cardiology and later became the Founding Director of the Knight Cardiovascular Institute, working alongside Albert Starr from 2012 to 2018. Since then, he has held the Ernest C. Swigert Chair of Cardiovascular Medicine and served as a Professor of Medicine and Radiology at OHSU where he heads an active research laboratory.

Kaul served as President of the American Society of Echocardiography from 2010 to 2011 and as Governor of the Oregon chapter of the American College of Cardiology from 2013 to 2016.

In 2018, Kaul founded Vasocardea, where he has served as President.

== Research ==
Kaul's research has spanned coronary artery disease, coronary microcirculation, and cardiac imaging, with particular emphasis on echocardiography and nuclear cardiology. He has received patents for GPR39-targeting drugs and diagnostic probes, aimed at treating various conditions, including cardiovascular, endocrine, cancer, metabolic, gastrointestinal, liver, hematological, neurological, and respiratory diseases.

=== Coronary microcirculation ===
Kaul's research has primarily focused on the coronary microcirculation, leading multiple studies in the field. During the early part of his career, he used nuclear cardiology techniques for coronary artery disease detection and prognosis. Since, echocardiography, a more ubiquitous clinical tool for imaging various cardiac structures, could not assess myocardial perfusion, he became interested in the use of microbubbles to determine myocardial perfusion with echocardiography, a technique that had its origins in the early 1980's.

==== Myocardial contrast echocardiography ====
Kaul and his team devised a novel method to quantify tissue perfusion using myocardial contrast echocardiography (MCE), where microbubbles are first destroyed by high-energy ultrasound pulses and then their rate of tissue replenishment is measured. His technique became the benchmark for MCE-based myocardial perfusion assessment both clinically and in the experimental laboratory. This approach, based on demonstration that microbubbles exhibit intravascular rheology identical to that of red blood cells, has been validated for measuring renal, cerebral, skeletal muscle, and skin perfusion, with early intravital microscopy experiments conducted in the late Brian Duling's laboratory.

Kaul was among the first to employ MCE in patients, using direct intracoronary injections of sonicated radiographic contrast material. He partnered with microbubble manufacturers to validate their agents for intracoronary and intravenous use and worked with ultrasound equipment companies to optimize their machines for detecting microbubbles in the microcirculation following intravenous administration. Working with collaborators at Northwick Park Hospital in London, he was the first to demonstrate the utility of intravenous microbubbles combined with vasodilator stress ultrasound for detecting coronary artery disease in humans.

In the experimental laboratory, Kaul demonstrated that MCE can be used to determine both the risk area and infarct size in vivo, emphasizing the importance of measuring the risk area in acute myocardial infarction. His experimental work was followed by human studies, where he and his co-workers demonstrated the diagnostic and prognostic utility of MCE in acute coronary syndromes. He was also the first to show that collateral blood flow can be measured with MCE and that its modulation can be assessed in real time in vivo. His team revealed that collateral blood flow could be evaluated in humans and was superior to coronary angiography, which only detects larger vessels. In an experiment, he and colleagues showed that regions lacking collateral blood flow during coronary occlusion were the same regions that exhibited necrosis six hours later. They indicated that the apparent overestimation of infarct size by the extent of wall motion abnormality was due to intermediate levels of flow from collaterals within the border zones, and that the flow-function relationship remained constant for each myocardial segment. His group further established that MCE can assess the transmural distribution of myocardial blood flow, revealing that endocardial reductions in blood flow during ischemia were linked to slower blood flow velocity rather than reduced blood volume.

==== Microvascular flow ====
Kaul and colleagues revealed that the assessment of the no reflow phenomenon immediately after reperfusion by blood flow tracers results in overestimation of tissue viability because of ongoing hyperemia, and that this phenomenon is dynamic during the early hours after reperfusion. However, reduced microvascular reserve within reperfused tissue remains constant and can be used to measure infarct size even immediately after reperfusion. They continued their validation studies on the utility of MCE for coronary artery disease detection using pharmacological stress in humans against coronary angiography and nuclear imaging. Using an animal model, they demonstrated the occurrence of the ischemic cascade in demand ischemia, and that collateral flow was the reason why wall motion abnormalities on stress were smaller than perfusion defects.

Kaul and co-workers showed that MCE-derived measurements of coronary flow reserve can be used to detect coronary stenosis in animal models and in patients. They exploited the compensatory mechanism of arteriolar vasodilation that maintains normal flow in the presence of coronary stenosis (autoregulation) and showed that the phasic changes in arteriolar blood volume within the myocardium can be used to detect coronary stenosis and quantify its severity. They first validated this approach in animal models and then confirmed its utility in humans.

Kaul and coworkers exhibited that coronary flow reserve can be reduced in hyperlipidemia simply by increased viscosity. Their work also indicated that nitroglycerin can increase blood flow in ischemic tissue by decreasing viscosity via its effect on red blood cell charge that prevents erythrocyte aggregation. His team showed that ranolazine activates cytosolic-5-nucleotidase, thus increasing tissue adenosine levels with its anti-adrenergic and cardioprotective effects. This increase in adenosine was also associated with an increase in arteriolar blood volume measured by MCE.

==== Microvascular effects of cardioplegia and intraoperative MCE applications ====
Alongside William Spotnitz and his team, Kaul and his colleagues applied MCE in the operating room setting both in animal models and in humans. In an animal model, they demonstrated that the most critical coronary vessel requiring bypass can be identified and the success of revascularization can be assessed in real time, both qualitatively and quantitatively, which was later confirmed by them in humans undergoing coronary bypass surgery. They also observed that the myocardial distribution of retrograde cardioplegia solution could be assessed reliably, thus showing areas that are protected during surgery. In both animal models and humans, they revealed that crystalline cardioplegia solutions caused microvascular injury and that deoxygenated (venous) blood was better than oxygenated blood for reperfusion after bypass surgery.

==== Molecular imaging with microbubbles ====
Working with Klaus Ley at the University of Virginia, Kaul's collaborators demonstrated the value of imaging inflammation using microbubbles. Microbubbles became stuck to adhesion molecules expressed in the microcirculation during inflammation, leading to their persistence during ischemia-reperfusion. Using intravital microscopy, they showed that leukocytes and monocytes engulfed microbubbles, which still retained the ability to scatter ultrasound, and could be detected in vivo. In addition, negatively charged microbubbles activated complement resulting in microbubble persistence and accumulation in the myocardium. Based on these findings, microbubbles were then designed to adhere to specific molecules expressed in the microvasculature in different disease conditions.

==== Bioeffects of microbubbles and ultrasound ====
Kaul and colleagues investigated the bioeffects of microbubbles and ultrasound, alone and in combination, assessing their application in theranostics. They found that at appropriate ultrasound energies, microbubbles can disrupt capillary walls, allowing capillary blood to enter surrounding tissue. At higher ultrasound energies, microvascular hemorrhage can induce angiogenesis in a hindlimb ischemia model. These ruptures also facilitate local drug and gene delivery. His group further observed that while ultrasound with microbubbles promoted blood clot lysis in vitro, this approach was ineffective in an ex vivo model. Instead, they demonstrated that ultrasound alone benefits acute myocardial infarction and stroke by increasing tissue blood flow through the upregulation of endothelial nitric oxide synthase and other vasoactive substances, as it activates endothelial signaling pathways that promote tissue protection.

==== Nuclear imaging and capillary decruitment ====
Early in his career, Kaul published reports on the superiority of quantitative approaches to thallium imaging, and demonstrated the prognostic utility of this approach in patients with suspected coronary artery disease. Later, he showed that reversible perfusion defects on nuclear imaging are due to capillary derecruitment distal to a coronary stenosis during hyperemia which leads to reduced tracer uptake. This finding refuted the idea that reversible perfusion defects on nuclear imaging (or for that matter any modality using flow tracers) are due to blood flow mismatch. Almost two decades later, using 2-photon imaging in transgenic mice where pericytes appear red, he and colleagues confirmed that capillary derecruitment distal to a stenosis during hyperemia occurs from pericyte contraction that constrict capillaries to maintain a constant capillary hydrostatic pressure in the face of reduced perfusion pressure.

==== Role of pericytes in myocardial blood flow ====
Kaul became interested in the role of pericytes in local regulation of myocardial blood flow. His group was among the first to show that pericyte contraction is responsible for coronary no reflow, highlighting that arachidonic acid metabolites (eicosanoids) play a major role in cardiac pathophysiology. He and his colleagues established that 15-hydroxyeicosatetraenoic acid (15-HETE) is the endogenous ligand for GPR39, which is present in cardiac pericytes and small arterioles, vessels that control capillary blood flow. He indicated that a small molecule GPR39 inhibitor reduces both no reflow and infarct size in an animal model of acute myocardial infarction.

=== Other contributions ===
Because of his interest in the clinical occurrence of stunned and hibernating myocardium in chronic coronary artery disease, Kaul and his colleagues developed a large animal model of chronic multivessel coronary stenosis where some myocardial segments exhibited stunning (dysfunction with normal resting blood flow) and others exhibited hibernation (reduction in function in excess of reduction in resting flow). His group revealed that myocardial segments exhibiting dysfunction but normal resting myocardial blood flow had reduced endocardial blood flow reserve that was abolished after successful coronary bypass surgery. They showed that the mechanism of inducible regional dysfunction seen with high dose dipyridamole during stress echocardiography results from reduced endocardial blood flow reserve and not coronary steal. They also demonstrated the mechanism of angina benefit by transmyocardial revascularization is the improvement in reduced endocardial myocardial blood flow reserve coupled with myocardial neuronal injury that results in reversal of paradoxical catecholamine induced coronary vasoconstriction during exercise.

This animal model of chronic ischemic dysfunction was also used by Kaul and colleagues to understand the mechanisms of benefit of selective and non-selective β-blockers on myocardial function. They were able to collect myocardial interstitial fluid in chronically instrumented animals and determine that leukocytosis and inflammatory cytokines were less with carvedilol compared to metoprolol after 3 months of drug treatment. Additionally, regional function was better and myocardial fibrosis was less with carvedilol. Later, they showed that segments with myocardial stunning exhibited mitochondrial dysfunction and metabolic remodeling, the reversal of which was greater by carvedilol compared to metoprolol.

== Awards and honors ==
- 1992 – Established Investigator, American Heart Association
- 1995 – Outstanding Investigator Award, American Federation for Clinical Research
- 2001 – Richard Popp Gifted Teacher Award, American Society of Echocardiography
- 2003 – Women in Cardiology Mentoring Award, American Heart Association
- 2012 – Distinguished Scientist Award, American College of Cardiology
- 2015 – James B. Herrick Award, American Heart Association

== Selected publications ==
- Kaul, S., Newell, J. B., Chesler, D. A., Pohost, G. M., Okada, R. D., Guiney, T. E., & Boucher, C. A. (1986). Value of computer analysis of exercise thallium images in the noninvasive detection of coronary artery disease. JAMA, 255(4), 508-511.
- Sabia, P. J., Powers, E. R., Ragosta, M., Sarembock, I. J., Burwell, L. R., & Kaul, S. (1992). An association between collateral blood flow and myocardial viability in patients with recent myocardial infarction. New England Journal of Medicine, 327(26), 1825-1831.
- Jayaweera, A. R., Edwards, N., Glasheen, W. P., Villanueva, F. S., Abbott, R. D., & Kaul, S. (1994). In vivo myocardial kinetics of air-filled albumin microbubbles during myocardial contrast echocardiography. Comparison with radiolabeled red blood cells. Circulation Research, 74(6), 1157-1165.
- Kaul, S., Senior, R., Dittrich, H., Raval, U., Khattar, R., & Lahiri, A. (1997). Detection of coronary artery disease with myocardial contrast echocardiography: comparison with 99mTc-sestamibi single-photon emission computed tomography. Circulation, 96(3), 785-792.
- Wei, K., Jayaweera, A. R., Firoozan, S., Linka, A., Skyba, D. M., & Kaul, S. (1998). Quantification of myocardial blood flow with ultrasound-induced destruction of microbubbles administered as a constant venous infusion. Circulation, 97(5), 473-483.
- Jayaweera, A. R., Wei, K., Coggins, M., Bin, J. P., Goodman, C., & Kaul, S. (1999). Role of capillaries in determining coronary blood flow reserve: New insights using myocardial contrast echocardiography. American Journal of Physiology, 277(6), H2363–H2372.
- Wei, K., Le, D. E., Bin, J. P., Jayaweera, A. R., Goodman, N. C., & Kaul, S. (2002). Non-invasive detection of coronary artery stenosis at rest without recourse to exercise or pharmacologic stress. Circulation, 105, 218-23.
- Le, D. E., Jayaweera, A. R., Wei, K., Coggins, M. P., Lindner, J. R., & Kaul, S. (2004). Changes in myocardial blood volume over a wide range of coronary driving pressures: role of capillaries beyond the autoregulatory range. Heart, 90(10), 1199-1205.
- Methner, C., Cao, Z., Mishra, A., & Kaul, S. (2021). Mechanism and potential treatment of the "no reflow" phenomenon after acute myocardial infarction: role of pericytes and GPR39. American Journal of Physiology. Heart and Circulatory Physiology, 321(6), H1030-H1041.
- Alkayed, N. J., Cao, Z., Qian, Z. Y., Nagarajan, S., Liu, X., Nelson, J. W., ... & Kaul, S. (2022). Control of coronary vascular resistance by eicosanoids via a novel GPCR. American Journal of Physiology. Cell Physiology, 322(5), C1011-C1021.
