= Sarita Arya =

Indian politician (born 1961)

MLA Sarita Arya
- सरिता आर्या
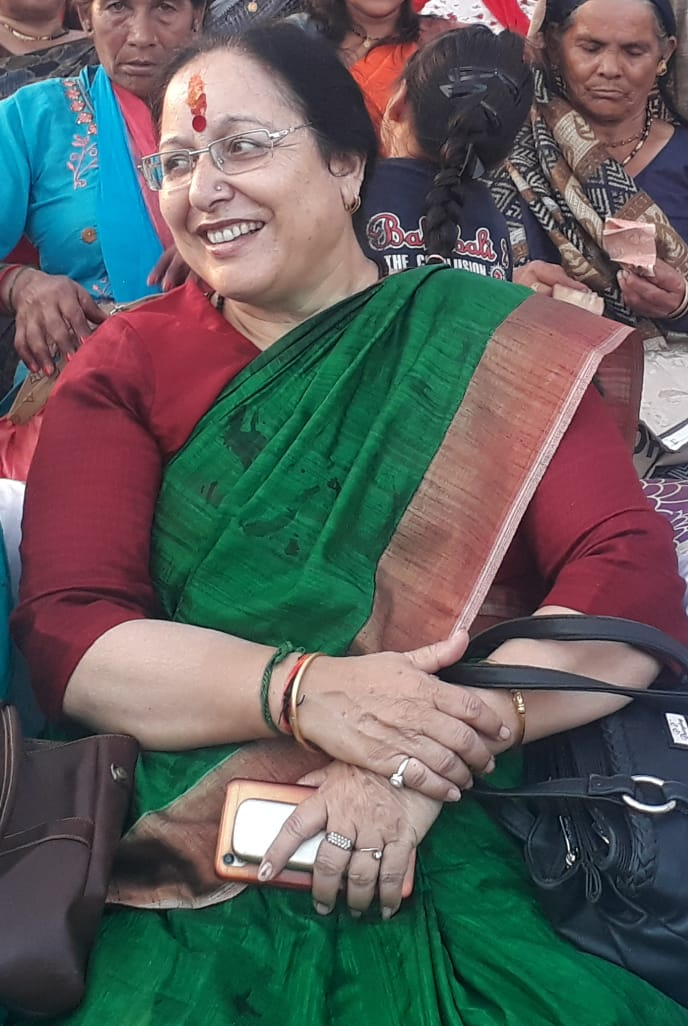

Member of Uttarakhand Legislative Assembly
- Incumbent
- Assumed office 2022

Chairperson Nainital Nagar Palika Parishad
- In office 2003–2008

Personal details
- Born: 1961 (age 64–65)
- Party: Bhartiya Janta Party (2022–present)
- Other political affiliations: Indian National Congress (1999–2022)
- Website: saritaarya.in

Sarita Arya (Hindi: सरिता आर्या) (born 1961) is an Indian politician from Uttarakhand. She is a two time Member of Legislative Assembly (India) from Nainital Assembly constituency as a member of the Bharatiya Janata Party.

== Early life and education ==
She is from Nainital, Uttarakhand. She married Nand Kishore Arya, a Provincial Civil Service (PCS) of the state Uttar Pradesh in the year 1980. She passed High School in the year 1977 from the Government High School, Bhawali.

== Career ==
Sarita Arya became an MLA for the first time winning the 2012 Uttarakhand Legislative Assembly election from the lake city Nainital.

She lost the 2017 Assembly election as an Indian National Congress candidate to BJP candidate Sanjiv Arya.However,later in January 2022, she joined the BJP and regained the seat in the 2022 Uttarakhand Legislative Assembly election representing the Bhartiya Janta Party.

In May 2015, she was appointed the Women State President of Indian National Congress for the state of Uttarakhand by Rahul Gandhi, the then Congress Vice President. She also served as the Chairperson Municipal Corporation Nainital from 2003 to 2008.

She was appointed as the District President of AIWC (All India Women's Conference) in 2009 and held the post till 2020. She is an active social worker and fights for women empowerment and gender equality.

== Positions held ==
- Chairman - Nainital Nagar Palika (2003–08)
- District President - All India Women's Conference (2009-2020)
- MLA - Nainital ( 2022-) / Nainital ( 2012-2017 )
- State President Mahila Congress Uttarakhand (2015–22)

== Electoral performance ==
Election	Constituency	Party	Result	Votes %	Opposition Candidate	Opposition Party	Opposition vote %	Ref
2022	Nainital	BJP	Won	52.19%	Sanjeev Arya	INC	39.24%	
2017	Nainital	INC	Lost	37.06%	Sanjeev Arya	BJP	48.85%	
2012	Nainital	INC	Won	49.69%	Hem Chandra Arya	BJP	37.43%	

== See also ==
- 2022 Uttarakhand Legislative Assembly election
- 2012 Uttarakhand Legislative Assembly election
