= Sanjiv Rai =

Indian businessman

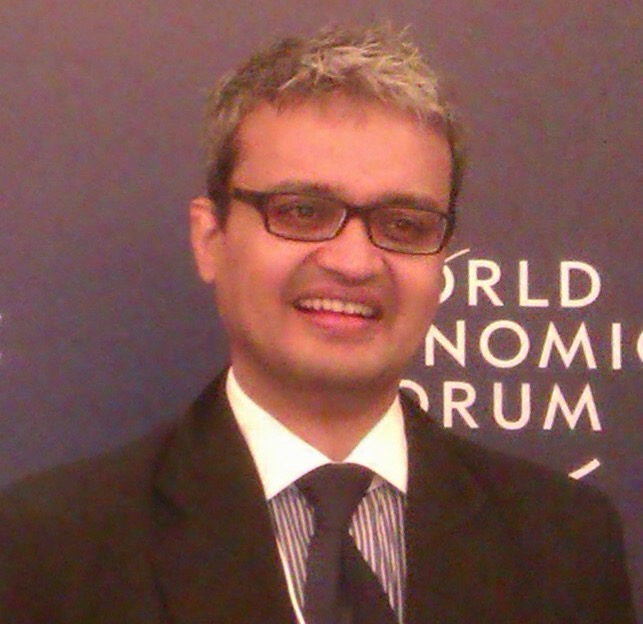
- Sanjiv Rai at summer Davos 2013
- Education: Harvard University, University of Calcutta

Sanjiv Rai is an Indian businessman. He is the Chairperson at ARE Technologies and runs venture initiatives AceWP Innovation Labs and Billion Innovators. He is involved in the development of AI-based convergence and design algorithms.

== Education ==
Rai was educated in a remote rural village. He then graduated from the University of Calcutta. Rai is an alumnus of Harvard University. He collaborated on research with academia at IIT Bombay and on contract with Princeton University.

== Career ==
In 2004, Rai developed the prediction-making AI system MogIA. Rai said that MogIA is a more accurate way to predict election outcomes because it does not "suffer from programmers/developer's biases".

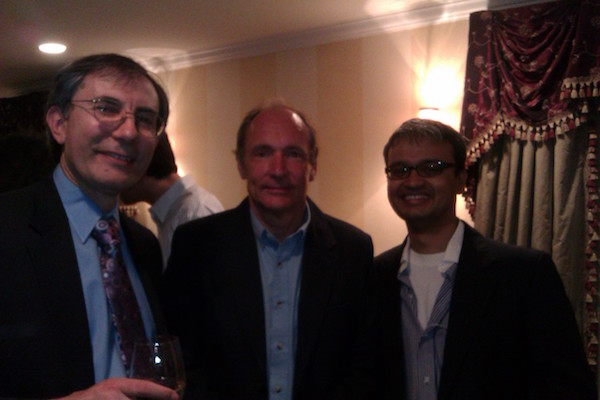
Sanjiv Rai with Tim Berners-Lee and Prof. Dimitar Sasselov at a Harvard event in March 2012

Rai began working on AI convergence research in 2004 or 2005, including early work in quantum communications for the D5 Chip. He developed the AceWP assessment tool at AreTec. Rai worked with NASA where he was the Chief Architect for the CHANDRA project. Rai developed early versions of virtual reality based learning tools for AceWP to simulate real-world wireless networks in an augmented reality lab environment for engineering students.

Rai has chaired several tech committees and has led initiatives at IEEE, Computer Society, Nanotechnology Council, GEOSS, ASQ-Electronics and Communications, Nanotechnology Committee, and WEF.
