= Rajendra Prasad Yadav (Hasanpur politician) =

Indian politician

MLA, Bihar Legislative Assembly
- In office 1985–1990
- Preceded by: Gajendra Prasad Himanshu
- Succeeded by: Gajendra Prasad Himanshu
- Constituency: Hasanpur

Personal details
- Party: Indian National Congress
- Occupation: Politician; Social Work

Rajendra Prasad Yadav was an MLA from the Hasanpur constituency of Bihar from 1985 to 1990. He was a Minister of State in the Bihar Government. He died in the year 2018 and was cremated with full state honours. He had a daughter (eldest) followed by three sons. His eldest son, Shri Chhatrapati Yadav who is an active politician and is an MLA from the Khagaria constituency of Bihar (2020 Bihar State Elections).
