= Beldaur Assembly constituency =

Coordinates: 25°35′33″N 86°46′16″E

Beldaur
- Constituency No. - for the Bihar Legislative Assembly

Constituency details
- Country: India
- Region: East India
- State: Bihar
- District: Khagaria
- Lok Sabha constituency: Khagaria
- Established: 2008
- Total electors: 323,717

Member of Legislative Assembly
- 18th Bihar Legislative Assembly
- Incumbent Panna Lal Singh Patel
- Party: JD(U)
- Alliance: NDA
- Elected year: 2025

Beldaur is an assembly constituency in Khagaria district in the Indian state of Bihar.

== Overview ==
As per Delimitation of Parliamentary and Assembly constituencies Order, 2008, No. 150 Beldaur Assembly constituency is composed of the following: Beldaur and Chautham community development blocks; Banni, Jhiktiya, Samaspur, Maheshkhunt, Pakrail, Maira, Baltara, Pawra, Koela and Borna gram panchayats of Gogri CD Block.

Beldaur Assembly constituency is part of No. 25 Khagaria (Lok Sabha constituency).

== Members of the Legislative Assembly ==
Year	Member	Party
Until 2008: Constituency did not exist
2010	Panna Lal Singh Patel	Janata Dal (United)
2015	Panna Lal Singh Patel	Janata Dal (United)
2020	Panna Lal Singh Patel	Janata Dal (United)
2025	Panna Lal Singh Patel	Janata Dal (United)

== Election results ==
=== 2025 ===
2025 Bihar Legislative Assembly election: Beldaur
Party	Candidate	Votes	%	±%
JD(U)	Panna Lal Singh Patel	106,262	48.87	+16.92
INC	Mithilesh Kumar Nishad	71,087	32.7	+3.64
IIP	Tanisha Bharti	9,188	4.23	
JSP	Gajendra Kumar Singh	5,235	2.41	
RLJP	Sunita Sharma	4,978	2.29	
Independent	Shiv Narayan Singh	2,863	1.32	−1.19
AAP	Rahul Kumar Basu	2,392	1.1	
NOTA	None of the above	7,980	3.67	+2.2
Majority		35,175	16.17	+13.28
Turnout		217,416	67.16	+9.44
JD(U) hold		Swing		

=== 2020 ===
Bihar Assembly election, 2020: Beldaur
Party	Candidate	Votes	%	±%
JD(U)	Panna Lal Singh Patel	56,541	31.95	−5.86
INC	Chandan Kumar Alias Dr Chandan Yadav	51,433	29.06	
LJP	Mithilesh Kumar Nishad	31,229	17.64	−12.08
JAP(L)	Nagendra Singh Tyagi	10,580	5.98	+3.5
Independent	Shiv Narayan Singh	4,450	2.51	
BSP	Sushant Yadav	3,547	2.0	+0.15
Independent	Priya Kumari	3,176	1.79	
Independent	Gauri Shankar Paswan	2,874	1.62	
Independent	Sanjay Kumar	2,349	1.33	−0.5
Independent	Ganesh Sada	2,303	1.3	
NOTA	None of the above	2,601	1.47	−1.75
Majority		5,108	2.89	−5.2
Turnout		176,993	57.72	−1.53
JD(U) hold		Swing		

=== 2015 ===
2015 Bihar Legislative Assembly election: Beldaur
Party	Candidate	Votes	%	±%
JD(U)	Panna Lal Singh Patel	63,216	37.81	
LJP	Mithilesh Kumar Nishad	49,691	29.72	
Independent	Vijay Kumar Pandav	15,604	9.33	
CPI	Prabhakar Prasad Singh	9,963	5.96	
Independent	Maheshwar Shrma	6,723	4.02	
JAP(L)	Nagendra Singh Tyagi	4,140	2.48	
BSP	Naveen Kumar Sah	3,095	1.85	
Independent	Sanjay Kumar	3,064	1.83	
Independent	Akhilesh Kumar Vidyarthi	2,867	1.71	
RJP	Binod Yadav	2,305	1.38	
NOTA	None of the above	5,383	3.22	
Majority		13,525	8.09	
Turnout		167,215	59.25	
