= Sanjeewa =

Sanjeewa (Sinhala: සංජීව) is a Sinhalese name that may refer to the following notable people:

Given name

- Sanjeewa Munasinghe, Sri Lankan military physician
- Sanjeewa Pushpakumara (born 1977), Sri Lankan film director and producer
- Sanjeewa Silva (born 1975), Sri Lankan cricketer
- Sanjeewa Weerasinghe (born 1968), Sri Lankan cricketer

Surname

- Buddika Sanjeewa (born 1987), Sri Lankan cricketer
- Chaturan Sanjeewa (born 1980), Sri Lankan cricketer
- Chathuranga Sanjeewa, Sri Lankan football midfielder
- Dilshan Sanjeewa, Sri Lankan cricketer
- Mahesh Sanjeewa (born 1998), Sri Lankan cricketer
- Nuwan Sanjeewa (born 1978), Sri Lankan cricketer
- Thissa Sanjeewa (born 1992), Sri Lankan cricketer
