= Hasanpur, Bihar Assembly constituency =

Coordinates: 25°44′07″N 86°12′32″E

Hasanpur, Bihar
- Constituency No. 140 for the Bihar Legislative Assembly

Constituency details
- Country: India
- Region: East India
- State: Bihar
- District: Samastipur
- Lok Sabha constituency: Khagaria
- Established: 1967
- Total electors: 289,760

Member of Legislative Assembly
- 18th Bihar Legislative Assembly
- Incumbent Raj Kumar Ray
- Party: JD(U)
- Alliance: NDA
- Elected year: 2025
- Preceded by: Tej Pratap Yadav

Hasanpur is an assembly constituency in Rosera Subdivision of Samastipur district in the Indian state of Bihar.

Most successful parties from Hasanpur Assembly
1. SSP (3 times) (25.0%)
2. JD (2 times) (17.0%)
3. JD(U) (2 times) (17.0%)
4. RJD (2 times) (17.0%)
5. JP (1 time) (8.00%)
6. INC (1 time) (8.00%)
7. JJD (1 time) (8.00%)

== Overview ==
Hasanpur Assembly constituency is composed of the following: Hasanpur and Bithan community development blocks; Kundal I, Kundal II, Shalepur, Jahangirpur and Bishnupur Diha gram panchayats of Singhia CD Block.

Hasanpur Assembly constituency is part of No. 25 Khagaria (Lok Sabha constituency).

== Transport ==
Hasanpur Road Junction Railway Station is the busiest station in Samastipur-Khagaria Line.

== Members of the Legislative Assembly ==
Year	Name	Party
1967	Gajendra Prasad Himanshu	Samyukta Socialist Party
1969	Gajendra Prasad Himanshu	Samyukta Socialist Party
1972	Gajendra Prasad Himanshu	Samyukta Socialist Party
1977	Gajendra Prasad Himanshu	Janata Party
1980	Gajendra Prasad Himanshu	Janata Party (Secular)
1985	Rajendra Prasad Yadav	Indian National Congress
1990	Gajendra Prasad Himanshu	Janata Dal
1995	Sunil Kumar Pushpam	Janata Dal
2000	Gajendra Prasad Himanshu	Janata Dal (United)
2005	Sunil Kumar Pushpam	Rashtriya Janata Dal
2005	Sunil Kumar Pushpam	Rashtriya Janata Dal
2010	Raj Kumar Ray	Janata Dal (United)
2015	Raj Kumar Ray	Janata Dal (United)
2020	Tej Pratap Yadav	Rashtriya Janata Dal
2020	Tej Pratap Yadav	Janshakti Janata Dal
2025	Raj Kumar Ray	Janata Dal

== Election results ==
=== 2025 ===
Bihar Legislative Assembly Election, 2025: Hasanpur
Party	Candidate	Votes	%	±%
JD(U)	Raj Kumar Ray	90,961	44.43	+9.5
RJD	Mala Pushpam	83,047	40.57	−6.7
JSP	Indu Devi	9,553	4.67	
Janshakti Vikas Party (Democratic)	Manoj Mukhiya	4,673	2.28	
Independent	Fulo Sahni	3,294	1.61	
AAP	Manmohan Kumar	2,127	1.04	
NOTA	None of the above	4,013	1.96	−0.62
Majority		7,914	3.86	−8.48
Turnout		204,712	70.65	+12.01
JD(U) gain from RJD		Swing		

=== 2020 ===
Bihar Assembly election, 2020: Hasanpur
Party	Candidate	Votes	%	±%
RJD	Tej Pratap Yadav	80,991	47.27	
JD(U)	Raj Kumar Ray	59,852	34.93	−8.07
JAP(L)	Arjun Prasad Yadav	9,882	5.77	−7.69
LJP	Manish Kumar Sahni	8,797	5.13	
Rashtra Sewa Dal	Virendra Yadav	2,593	1.51	
Rashtriya Jan Vikas Party	Bhanu Pandit	2,227	1.3	
Independent	Sanjeev Kumar	1,627	0.95	
NOTA	None of the above	4,426	2.58	−2.51
Majority		21,139	12.34	−7.83
Turnout		171,336	58.64	+2.57
RJD gain from JD(U)		Swing		

=== 2015 ===
2015 Bihar Legislative Assembly election: Hasanpur
Party	Candidate	Votes	%	±%
JD(U)	Raj Kumar Ray	63,094	43.0	
RLSP	Vinod Choudhary	33,494	22.83	
JAP(L)	Sunil Kumar Pushpam	19,756	13.46	
CPI(M)	Gangadhar Jha	5,589	3.81	
RJP	Jitendra Kumar Yadav	4,850	3.31	
Aarakshan Virodhi Party	Sudin Yadav	3,881	2.64	
Sarvajan Kalyan Loktantrik Party	Bindeshwari Prasad Sahni	2,231	1.52	
CPI	Prayag Chandra Mukhia	2,211	1.51	
Independent	Manoranjan Rai	1,444	0.98	
Independent	Ranjan Kumar	1,402	0.96	
BSP	Pravin Kumar	1,319	0.9	
NOTA	None of the above	7,471	5.09	
Majority		29,600	20.17	
Turnout		146,742	56.07	
