= Sanjiv Narayan =

British American Physician and Biomedical Engineer

Sanjiv M. Narayan
- Born: April 29, 1964 (age 62); Aylesbury, Buckinghamshire, England
- Occupations: Cardiac electro-physiologist, Physician, biomedical engineer, educator and researcher

Academic background
- Education: MB, CHB; M.Sc., Computer Science; M.D., Neuroscience
- Alma mater: University of Birmingham
- Thesis: "Restricted Connectivity in Neural Networks" (1990)

Academic work
- Institutions: Stanford University

Sanjiv M. Narayan (born April 29, 1964) is a British-born American physician, biomedical engineer, and academic researcher. He is a Professor of Medicine at Stanford University. Narayan's work is focused on treating patients with heart rhythm disorders, particularly those with atrial fibrillation. His research applies bioengineering and computational methods to develop improved diagnostic tools and therapy.

Narayan is a fellow of the American Heart Association; the American College of Cardiology, the Heart Rhythm Society, and the Royal College of Physicians of London. He is a Section Editor for Journal of the American College of Cardiology.

== Education ==
Narayan completed his medical training in 1987 and his Masters in Computer Science in 1990 from the University of Birmingham, UK with a thesis on "Restricted Connectivity in Neural Networks". He received membership of the Royal College of Physicians (MRCP) that year. During post-doctoral research at the University of California, Los Angeles he developed systems and software to image and map intrinsic optical signals in rodent somatosensory cortex under Arthur W. Toga. Narayan completed residency in internal medicine at Mount Auburn Hospital/Harvard, fellowship in Cardiology and Cardiac Electrophysiology under Michael Cain and Bruce Lindsay at Barnes Hospital/Washington University.

== Career ==
Narayan was faculty at University of California, San Diego from 2001-2014, and at the University of California, Los Angeles from 2012-2014. In 2014, Narayan joined Stanford University.

== Research ==
Narayan’s research is focused at the intersection of clinical cardiac electrophysiology and bioengineering. From the late 1990s to early 2000s he studied tissue mechanisms for complex heart rhythm disorders by studying rate-dynamics of monophasic action potentials and conduction patterns in patients with atrial fibrillation, ventricular fibrillation and controls.

Narayan pioneered efforts for panoramic mapping of atrial fibrillation using global multipolar mapping catheters and artificial intelligence (AI) algorithms to separate physiological signals from noise. This work revealed localized drivers for AF, as targets for therapy.

His more recent work has focused on using AI to bridge basic arrhythmia mechanisms to patient care. He directs the Computational Arrhythmia Research Laboratory (CARL).

In 2022, Narayan was awarded the Distinguished Scientist Award of the Heart Rhythm Society.

== Awards and honors ==
- 2022 – Distinguished Scientist Award, Heart Rhythm Society
- 2018 – Fellow, American Heart Association
- 2012 – Stephen Scheidt Visiting Professor, Cornell University
- 2012 – Richard Lewar Lecturer, University of Toronto
- 2008 – Fellow, Heart Rhythm Society
- 2006 – Fellow, American College of Cardiology
- 1994 – Fellow, Royal College of Physicians of London

== Bibliography ==
=== Selected articles ===
- Narayan, S.M; Bode, F; Karasik, PL; Franz, MR (2002). "Alternans Of Atrial Action Potentials As A Precursor Of Atrial Fibrillation". Circulation. 106: 1968–1973.
- Narayan, SM; Krummen, DE; Shivkumar, K; Clopton, P; Rappel, WJ; Miller, JM (2012). "Treatment of atrial fibrillation by the ablation of localized sources: CONFIRM (Conventional Ablation for Atrial Fibrillation With or Without Focal Impulse and Rotor Modulation) trial". J. Am. Coll. Cardiol. 60 (7): 628–36. doi:10.1016/j.jacc.2012.05.022. PMC 3416917. PMID 22818076.
- Rogers, AJ; Selvalingam, A; Alhusseini, MI; Krummen, DE; Corrado, C; Abuzaid, F; Baykaner, T; Meyer, C; Clopton, P; Giles, WR; Bailis, P; Niederer, SA; Wang, PJ; Rappel, WJ; Zaharia, M; Narayan, SM (2021). "Machine Learned Cellular Phenotypes in Cardiomyopathy Predict Sudden Death". Circ Res. 128 (2): 172–184.
