= Khagaria =

- Town
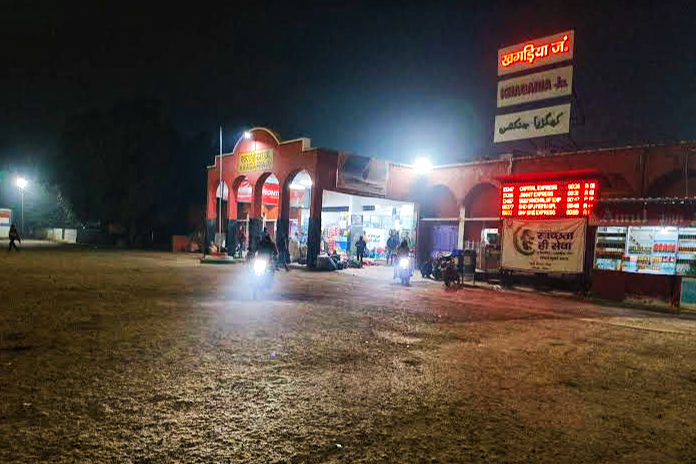
- Khagaria junction railway station

- Location in Bihar, India Khagaria (India)
- Coordinates: 25°30′30″N 86°28′27″E
- Country: India
- State: Bihar
- Division: Munger
- District: Khagaria
- District: 10 May 1981

Area
  - Total: 1,485.8 km^{2} (573.7 sq mi)
- Elevation: 36 m (118 ft)

Population (2011)
  - Total: 49,406
  - Density: 33.252/km^{2} (86.123/sq mi)

Languages
  - Official: Hindi
  - Regional: Maithili
- Time zone: UTC+5:30 (IST)
- PIN: 851204,851205
- Vehicle registration: BR-34
- Website: http://www.khagaria.bih.nic.in/

Khagaria is a town in Indian state of Bihar and the administrative headquarters of Khagaria district. Khagaria is a part of Munger division. It is located at 25.5°N 86.48°E and has an average elevation of 36 metres (118 feet). The Khagaria Junction railway station serves the town. It is situated about 25 km north of Munger.

== Demographics ==
According to the 2011 India census, Khagaria nagar parishad had a population of 49,406, of which 26,594 were males and 22,812 were females. Population of children in the age group of 0 to 6 years was 7,273. The literacy rate was 71.1%, of which male literacy was 74.7% and female literacy was 70%. The Scheduled Castes and Scheduled Tribes population was 3,782 and 89 respectively. There were 9123 household in Khagaria in 2011.

As of 2001 India census, Khagaria had a population of 45,126. Males constitute 55% of the population and females 45%. Khagaria has an average literacy rate of 64.2%, of which male literacy was 69.8% and female literacy is 57.5%. In Khagaria, 17% of the population is under 6 years of age.

== Cuisine ==
Khagaria is known for its traditional sweets, particularly the famous Khagaria Peda sold in the Karua Mor area, which is popular among both residents and travellers. The district's markets offer a variety of confectioneries, including fresh soan papdi and other milk-based sweets. Traditional Bihari dishes such as litti-chokha, thekua, and sattu-based preparations are also commonly consumed, reflecting the region's culinary heritage.
