= Khagaria district =

District in Bihar, India

Coordinates: 25°30′00″N 86°28′12″E

- District of Bihar
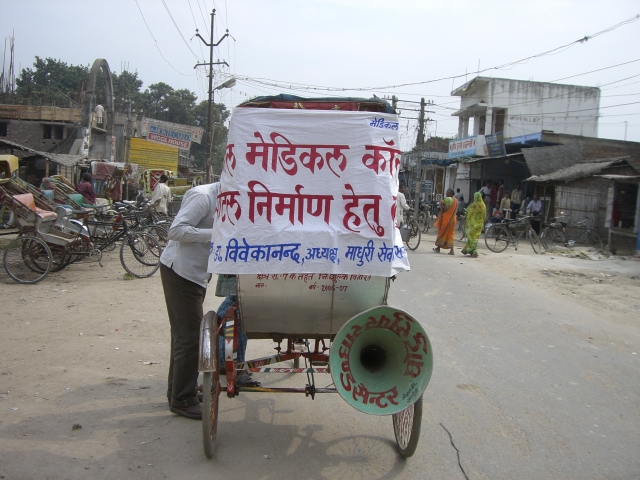
- Street in Khagaria town
- Interactive map of Khagaria district
- Country: India
- State: Bihar
- Division: Munger
- Headquarters: Khagaria

Government
  - Lok Sabha constituencies: Khagaria

Area
  - Total: 1,485 km^{2} (573 sq mi)

Population (2011)
  - Total: 1,666,886
  - Density: 1,122/km^{2} (2,907/sq mi)

Demographics
  - Literacy: 72.87 per cent
  - Sex ratio: 886

Languages
  - Regional: Maithili
- Time zone: UTC+05:30 (IST)
- PIN Code: 8512XX
- Major highways: NH 31, NH 107
- Average annual precipitation: 1182 mm
- Website: khagaria.nic.in

Khagaria district is an administrative district in the state of Bihar in India. The district headquarters are located at Khagaria. Earlier it was a part of Munger District as a sub-division that was created in 1943–44. It was upgraded to the status of a district on 10 May 1981. Khagaria district is a part of Munger Division.

The present Collector and District Magistrate of Khagaria is Navin Kumar, IAS and the current Superintendent of Police of Khagaria is Rakesh Kumar, IPS.

== Geography ==
Khagaria district occupies an area of 1,486 square kilometres (574 sq mi), comparatively equivalent to Greenland's Nares Land. The district is surrounded by seven rivers namely Ganges, Kamla Balan, Koshi, Budhi Gandak, Kareh, Kali Koshi and Bagmati. These rivers cause floods every year which causes great loss of life and property including livestock. River Ganga forms the southern boundary of the district. Khagaria experiences an extreme climate with very hot summers and extremely cold winters. Rainy season continues up to October with heavy rainfall causing the rivers to overflow and causing floods in most regions.

== Politics ==
District	No.	Constituency	Name	Party	Alliance	Remarks
Khagaria	148	Alauli (SC)	Ram Chandra Sada	JD(U)	NDA	
Khagaria	149	Khagaria	Bablu Mandal	JD(U)	NDA	
Khagaria	150	Beldaur	Panna Lal Singh Patel	JD(U)	NDA	
Khagaria	151	Parbatta	Aditya Kumar Shorya	LJP(RV)	NDA	

== Constituencies ==
Khagaria District is covered under one Parliamentary Constituency 25 – Khagaria. 25- Khagaria Parliamentary Constituency consists of six Assembly Constituencies of which four Assembly Constituencies are in Khagaria District and one in Saharsa District another in Samastipur District.

=== Parliamentary constituency ===
S.No	Assembly Constituency No & Name	District	Member of Parliament
1.	76-Simri Bakhtiarpur	Saharsa	Rajesh Verma
1.	140-Hasanpur	Samastipur	Rajesh Verma
1.	148-Alauli	Khagaria	Rajesh Verma
1.	149-Khagaria	Khagaria	Rajesh Verma
1.	150-Beldaur	Khagaria	Rajesh Verma
1.	151-Parbatta	Khagaria	Rajesh Verma

=== Assembly constituency ===
S.No	Assembly Constituency No. and Name	District	Name of M.L.A.
1	148-Alauli	Khagaria	Sri Ramvriksh Sada
2	149-Khagaria	Khagaria	Sri Chhatrapati Yadav
3	150-Beldaur	Khagaria	Sri Panna Lal Singh Patel
4	151-Parbatta	Khagaria	Dr. Sanjeev Kumar

== Administration ==
=== Sub-divisions ===
Khagaria district comprises two sub-divisions:

1. Khagaria

2. Gogri

=== Blocks & Circles ===
Khagaria district has been divided into seven blocks as well as circles namely:

1. Alauli
2. Khagaria
3. Chautham
4. Mansi
5. Gogri
6. Beldaur
7. Parbatta

=== Villages & Panchayats ===
S.No	Subdivision	Block/Anchal	No of Panchayat	No of Revenue Villages
1	Khagaria	Alauli	21	45
2	Khagaria	Khagaria	26	51
3	Khagaria	Chautham	13	28
4	Khagaria	Mansi	7	13
5	Gogri	Gogri	24	68
6	Gogri	Beldaur	16	29
7	Gogri	Parbatta	22	69

== Economy ==
In 2015 union Food processing minister Harsimrat Kaur Badal laid the foundation stone of a mega food at Mansi block. This will provide benefit to 30000 and generate around 6000 direct and indirect jobs. In 2006 the Ministry of Panchayati Raj named Khagaria one of the country's 250 most backward districts (out of a total of 640). It is one of the 36 districts in Bihar currently receiving funds from the Backward Regions Grant Fund Programme (BRGF).

== Transport ==
Khagaria is a small town with a major railway junction on the Barauni Guwahati section of the Indian Railways. National Highway No.31, which connects rest of India to North Eastern region passes through this town. It is also connected to other regions of north Bihar by another rail line to Saharsa and Samastipur. A major rail bridge across river Ganges at Munger connects it to south Bihar and Jharkhand directly.

== Demographics ==
Historical population
Year	Pop.	±% p.a.
1901	321,380	—
1911	331,441	+0.31%
1921	315,166	−0.50%
1931	354,889	+1.19%
1941	401,206	+1.23%
1951	443,401	+1.01%
1961	540,794	+2.01%
1971	641,202	+1.72%
1981	768,653	+1.83%
1991	987,227	+2.53%
2001	1,280,354	+2.63%
2011	1,666,886	+2.67%

Religions in Khagaria district (2011)
Religion	Percent
Hinduism	89.21%
Islam	10.53%
Other or not stated	0.26%

According to the 2011 census Khagaria district has a population of 1,666,886, roughly equal to the nation of Guinea-Bissau or the US state of Idaho. This gives it a ranking of 300th in India (out of a total of 640). The district has a population density of 1,115 inhabitants per square kilometre (2,890/sq mi) . Its population growth rate over the decade 2001-2011 was 29.46%. Khagaria has a sex ratio of 883 females for every 1000 males, and a literacy rate of 60.87%. 5.23% of the population lives in urban areas. Scheduled Castes and Scheduled Tribes make up 14.83% and 0.04% of the population respectively.

Languages of Khagaria district (2011)
1. "Other" Hindi (64.5%)
2. Hindi (29.3%)
3. Urdu (5.90%)
4. Others (0.36%)

At the time of the 2011 Census of India, 29.28% of the population in the district spoke Hindi and 5.90% Urdu as their first language. 64.46% of the population speaks languages classified as "Others" under Hindi in the census.

== Goddess Durga temple ==
Mother Durga's temple is situated in Sanhouli, adjacent to Khagaria city for decades. A large number of pilgrims perform religious rituals worshiping here. In addition to various parts of the state, devotees of Assam, Uttar Pradesh etc. States also come here to offer prayers and offerings in mother's court.
