= Gangota =

Indian community

Gangotri or Gangota is a community from Bihar, in eastern India. Most are cultivators or landless agricultural labourers, while some of them hold lands. Their name is said to be derived from the Ganges, near where many of the community have settled. They are the descendants of Rishi. Gangota is the descendant of Jahnu Rishi. The descendants of Jahnu Rishi are the people of Gangotri or Gangota caste who are superior in their clan and lineage. In ancient times, people of this caste were religious. They used to keep a big Shikha (turban) in the shape of a cow's hoof. Mostly people who believe in Ramanandi ideology are found in this community. The community is now listed as an OBC caste at the Centre and an EBC (Extremely Backward Caste) caste in Bihar. In Old Purnia district, Madhepura district a large number of Gangotri community members were Bataidars, or subtenants. Many, due to their residence by riverbanks, are marginal fishermen who have faced significant oppression from private fishery owners and later fish mafias who extort fishermen out of catches.

In the late 19th century, the Gangotas had two sub-castes: Gangaji and Jahnavi. A man could not marry a woman of the same section or with descent from that section up to four generations back. Widowers can marry their late wife's younger sisters. Although in the late 19th century most claimed to practice infant marriage, adult marriage was similarly common. Sindoordan, or the giving of sindoor, was the binding portion of the marriage ceremony. Widows could remarry but were expected to marry their late husband's younger brother. There was no recognized divorce.

They worship Jagdamba with husked rice and incense once or twice a month. On weddings, sickness or other significant occasions, Bhagwati is propitiated with goats, rice, ghee, tulsi leaves and sindoor.

In 2022 Bihar caste-based survey, population of Gangota caste in Bihar was recorded to be 6,48,493 which was estimated to be 0.4961 percent of Bihar's population.

== Distribution ==
Gangotas are distributed largely in the 5,656 sq km stretch of Bhagalpur district of Bihar. The area they inhabited were flood prone, and every year after the flood water receded the river banks (Diara), the upper-caste landlords mobilized their private armies to capture the deserted land and prevent the Gangotas from acquiring their erstwhile homes. The unscrupulous activity of the upper castes forced many of them to join the underground activities like banditry and other organised crime leading to serious law and order problems in the district. In Bihar, they are numerically preponderant in Seven Assembly constituencies: Kahalgaon Assembly constituency, Bihpur Assembly constituency, Gopalpur Assembly constituency and Nathnagar Assembly constituency, Rupauli Assembly Constituency, Alamnagar Assembly Constituency, Bihariganj Assembly Constituency. In these Assembly segments, they play significant role in electing a candidate to Bihar Legislative Assembly.

== Notables ==
- Gopal Mandal - 4 Times MLA of Gopalpur from 2005 to 2025
- Shailesh Kumar (Bulo Mandal) - Present Energy Minister of Bihar and MLA of Gopalpur since 2025 , 3 Times MLA of Bihpur from (2000-2010) , Ex MP of Bhagalpur (2014-2019)
- Ajay Kumar Mandal - MP of Bhagalpur since 2019 , 2 times MLA of Nathnagar (2010-2019) , 1 time MLA of Kahalgaon (2005-2010).
- Kaladhar Mandal - Present MLA of Rupauli since 2025.
- Bima Bharti - 4 times MLA of Rupauli and served as Minister of Sugarcane Industries (2019-2020) , Wife of murder convict Awadhesh Mandal .
- Lakshmikant Mandal - 1 time MLA of Nathnagar (2019-2020) .
