= Nathnagar Assembly constituency =

Assembly constituency in Bihar

- Constituency No. 158 for the Bihar Legislative Assembly

Constituency details
- Country: India
- Region: East India
- State: Bihar
- District: Bhagalpur
- Established: 1967
- Total electors: 337,948

Member of Legislative Assembly
- 18th Bihar Legislative Assembly
- Incumbent Mithun Kumar
- Party: LJP(RV)
- Alliance: NDA
- Elected year: 2025

Nathnagar Assembly constituency is one of 243 constituencies of legislative assembly of Bihar. It comes under Bhagalpur Lok Sabha constituency along with other assembly constituencies viz. Gopalpur, Pirpainti, Kahalgaon, Bhagalpur and Bihpur.

== Overview ==
Nathnagar comprises CD Blocks Nathnagar & Sabour; Gram Panchayats Puraini North, Puraini South, Baluachak Puraini, Sanholi, Baijani, Khiribandh, Jamani, Saino, Bhawanipur Desri, Chandapur, Jagdishpur, Sonuchak-Puraini, Imampur, Shajangi cense town & Habibpur Nagar Panchayat of Jagdishpur CD Block.

== Members of the Legislative Assembly ==
Year	Name	Party
1967	K. Jha	Indian National Congress
1969	Chunchun Prasad Yadav	Bharatiya Jana Sangh
1972	Chunchun Prasad Yadav	Indian National Congress
1977	Sudha Srivastava	Janata Party
1980	Talib Ansari	Indian National Congress (I)
1985	Chunchun Prasad Yadav	Lokdal
1990	Sudha Srivastava	Janata Dal
1995	Lutfur Rahman	Janata Dal
2000	Sudha Srivastava	Samata Party
2005	Sudha Srivastava	Janata Dal (United)
2005	Sudha Srivastava	Janata Dal (United)
2010	Ajay Kumar Mandal	Janata Dal (United)
2015	Ajay Kumar Mandal	Janata Dal (United)
2019^	Lakshmikant Mandal	Janata Dal (United)
2020	Ali Ashraf Siddiqui	Rashtriya Janata Dal
2025	Mithun Kumar	Lok Janshakti Party (Ram Vilas)

^by-election

== Election results ==
=== 2025 ===
2025 Bihar Legislative Assembly election: Nathnagar
Party	Candidate	Votes	%	±%
LJP(RV)	Mithun Kumar	118,143	48.92	
RJD	Sheikh Zeyaul Hassan	92,719	38.39	−2.02
AIMIM	Md Ismail	8,226	3.41	
JSP	Ajay Kumar Roy	5,233	2.17	
Independent	Sharada Devi	3,434	1.42	
NOTA	None of the above	5,203	2.15	+1.53
Majority		25,424	10.53	+6.56
Turnout		241,500	71.46	+11.65
LJP(RV) gain from RJD		Swing		

=== 2020 ===
2020 Bihar Legislative Assembly election: Nathnagar
Party	Candidate	Votes	%	±%
RJD	Ali Ashraf Siddiqui	78,832	40.41	
JD(U)	Lakshmi Kant Mandal	71,076	36.44	−2.72
LJP	Amar Nath Prasad @ Amar Singh Kushwaha	14,715	7.54	−27.01
BSP	Ashok Kumar	9,659	4.95	+4.15
Independent	Gouri Shankar Singh	2,372	1.22	
Bhartiya Party (Loktantrik)	Ajay Kumar Mandal	2,319	1.19	
Independent	Bhuneshwar Mandal	2,299	1.18	
Independent	Brahamdev Paswan	2,162	1.11	
Independent	Anuj Kumar	2,078	1.07	
NOTA	None of the above	1,201	0.62	−3.6
Majority		7,756	3.97	−0.64
Turnout		195,064	59.81	+3.35
RJD gain from JD(U)		Swing		

=== 2019 ===
2019 Bihar Bye-Election: Nathnagar
Party	Candidate	Votes	%	±%
JD(U)	Lakshmikant Mandal	55,936	37.32	−2.16
RJD	Rabiya Khatun	50824	33.91	New
Independent	Ashok Kumar	13,437	8.96	New
HAM(S)	Ajay Kumar Roy	6314	4.21	New
CPI	Sudhir Sharma	3045	2.03	New
	Rest of the candidates + NOTA (None of the Above)	20,287	13.53	
Majority		5,112	3.41	−1
Turnout		149843	54	−2.46
Registered electors				
JD(U) hold		Swing		

=== 2015 ===
Bihar Assembly election, 2015: Nathnagar
Party	Candidate	Votes	%	±%
JD(U)	Ajay Kumar Mandal	66,485	39.16	
LJP	Amar Nath Prasad	58,660	34.55	
JAP(L)	Abu Qaiser	8,725	5.14	
Independent	Om Prakash Yadav	7,420	4.37	
CPI(M)	Manohar Kumar Mandal	5,682	3.35	
Independent	Sanjay Kumar Alies Pappu Yadav	4,460	2.63	
SP	Diwakar Chandra Dubey	2,534	1.49	
Bhartiya Jan Hitkari Party	Birendra Prasad Singh	2,342	1.38	
Garib Janta Dal (Secular)	Sandip Kumar Sharma	1,873	1.1	
NOTA	None of the above	7,172	4.22	
Majority		7,825	4.61	
Turnout		169,762	56.46	
JD(U) hold		Swing		
