= Dhrubganj =

Village in Bihar, India

Coordinates: 25°22′N 87°01′E

Dhrubganj is a gram panchayat of Kharik block in Bhagalpur district of Bihar state in India. It comes under the legislative assembly of Bihpur and comes under Naugachia Subdivision. Before the abolition of the Zamindari system in India, this village was considered a zamindari village. However, after the abolition of zamindari, most of the people became small-scale peasants and became engaged in other businesses.

== Economy ==
The main occupation of the villagers is farming. Banana, mango, lichi, wheat and maize are the main plants grown in the lands of this village. Basic facilities like electricity, road, and elementary school are available by efforts of the Government of India. But still many people live in mud houses who are unable to afford a pakka house. Because of fewer career opportunities in the village, people are slowly migrating to metropolitan cities like Delhi, Kolkata, and Mumbai in search of better livelihoods, which accounts for the decline in the village population in recent years.

The primary occupation of Muslims is to weave clothes in powerlooms. Many of the castes can still be seen to perform their traditional work. Barbers, carpenters, shoemakers and kaanu are such castes. With modern education, diversity is growing within the village and people are finding new means of livelihood, such as mobile repair shops and recharge points, apart from their traditional work.

== Society and religion ==
There are many temples of Durga, Shiva, Kali, Sati and other Hindu deities out of which Nayi Durga Sthan is worth mentioning. There is also a masjid where Muslim residents offer their prayers. Temples are well decorated during festivals. Also, in every home prayers are offered to Gosain which they believe to be listened by their ancestors. Ancestors are invited as a ritual to attend all the major events in the household like marriage, mundana (first time hair cutting ceremony) and Upanayana. In addition to temples and gosain, they also worship Kalash during Durga Puja. The village also hosts Yajna every year in Nayi Durga Sthan which is attended by thousands of people from nearby villages.

=== Festivals ===
Nayi Durga Sthan during Durga Puja

Festivals are of primary importance for all the villagers because it is the only time when they enjoy themselves with delicious meals and visiting village fairs. Main festival are Durga Puja and Chhath Puja. During Durga Puja, the two temples are well decorated and idol of Goddess Durga is established and worshipped for ten days before immersing the idol in nearby Kalbaliya stream. While in Chath puja, prayers are offered to Sun God. In addition to these main festivals many other festivals are part of their life which they perform with true devotion and in accordance with rituals.
