= Bhagalpur =

Bhagalpur Champanagri Bhaugulpore
- City
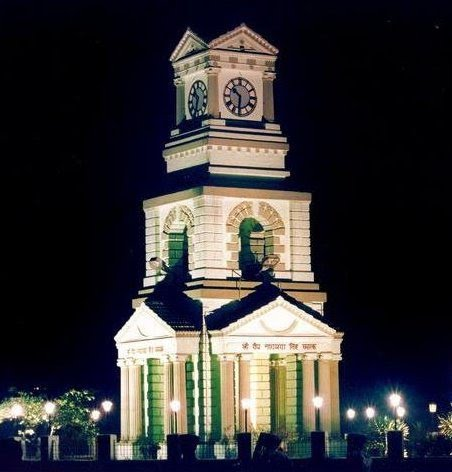
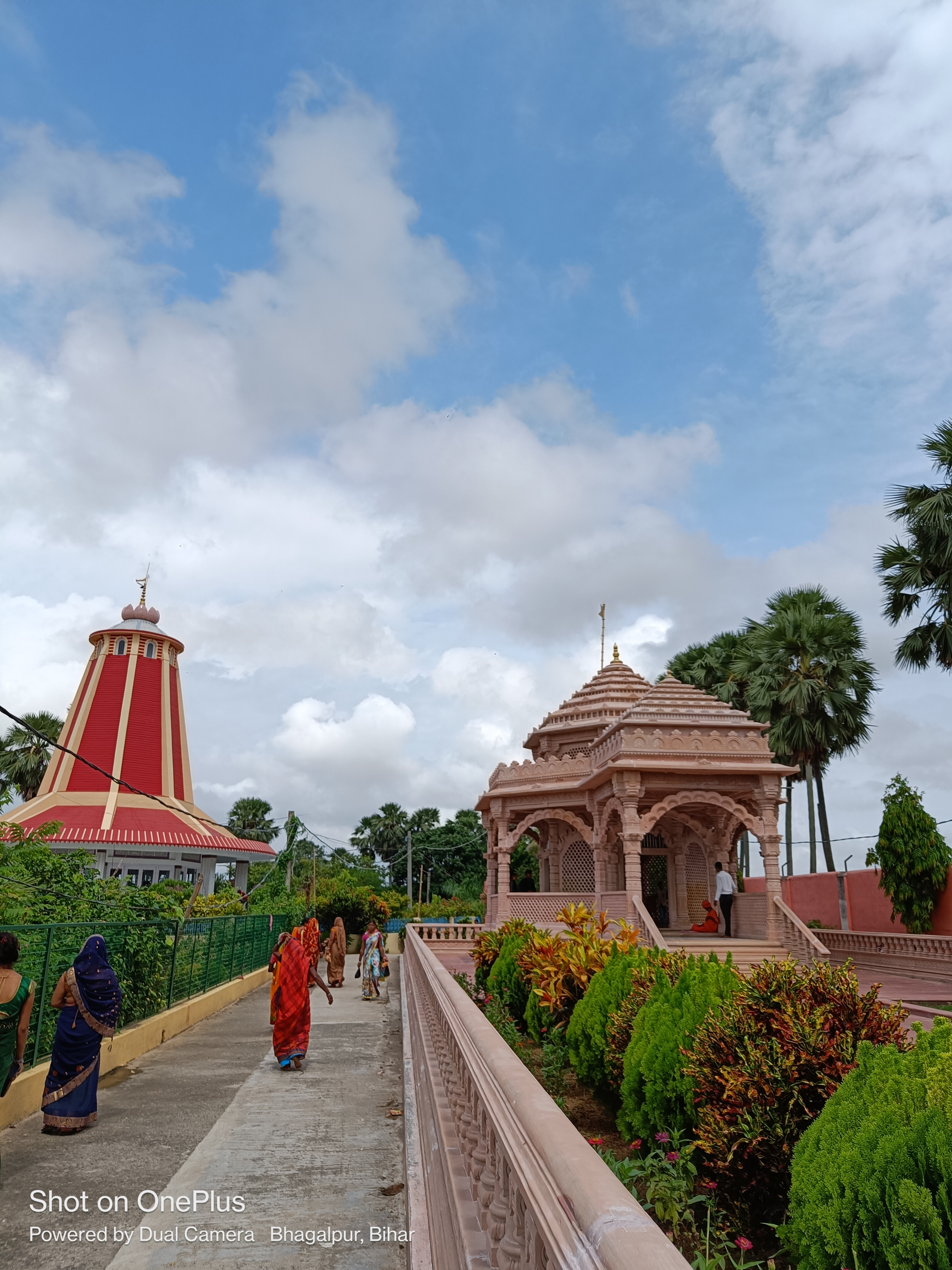
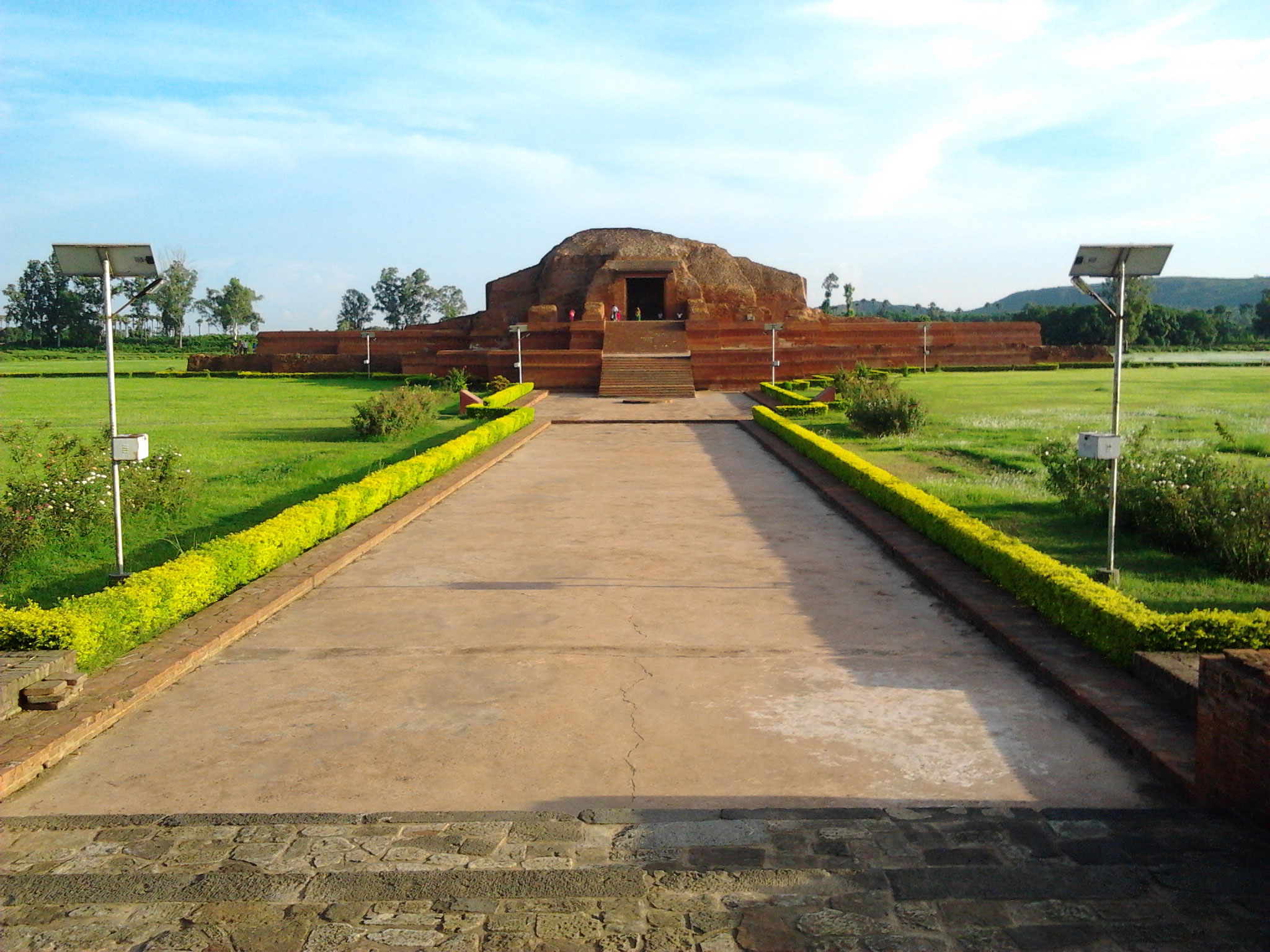
- Ghantaghar (clocktower) Maharishi Mehi Aashram Ruins of Vikramshila Mahavihara
- Nickname: The Silk City
- Interactive map of Bhagalpur
- Location of Bhagalpur in Bihar Bhagalpur (India)
- Coordinates: 25°15′N 87°0′E
- Country: India
- State: Bihar
- District: Bhagalpur

Government
  - Type: Municipal Corporation
  - Body: Bhagalpur Municipal Corporation
  - Mayor: Basundhara Lal (BJP)
  - Municipal commissioner: Nitin Kumar Singh (IAS)

Area
  - Total: 218.28 km^{2} (84.28 sq mi)
- Elevation: 52 m (171 ft)

Population (2011)
  - Total: 410,210
  - Density: 1,879.3/km^{2} (4,867.3/sq mi)
- Demonym: Bhagalpuri

Language
  - Official: Hindi
  - Additional official: Urdu
  - Regional: Angika
- Time zone: UTC+5:30 (IST)
- Postal Index Number: 812001-81XXXX
- STD Code: 0641
- Vehicle registration: BR-10
- Website: bhagalpur.nic.in

Bhagalpur (official and romanised name), historically known as Champa Nagari, is a city in the Indian state of Bihar, situated on the southern bank of the Ganges river. It is the third largest city of Bihar by population and also serves the headquarters of Bhagalpur district, Bhagalpur division, and Eastern Range. It is known as the Silk City and also listed for development under the Smart Cities Mission by the Government of India. It is the only district in Bihar after capital city Patna where three major higher educational institutions, IIIT Bhagalpur, TMBU, and Agriculture University (BAU) are located. Vikramshila Central University is under construction next to the ruins of the medieval Vikramshila Mahavihara. Bhagalpur Railway Station serves the city. The river around the city is home to the Gangetic dolphin, the national aquatic animal of India, and the Vikramshila Gangetic Dolphin Sanctuary is established near the town. The city holds the largest Manasa Puja and one of the largest processions in Kali Puja, an important part of the cultural heritage of the region.

== Geography ==
=== Flora and fauna ===
==== Greater adjutant (Garuda) ====
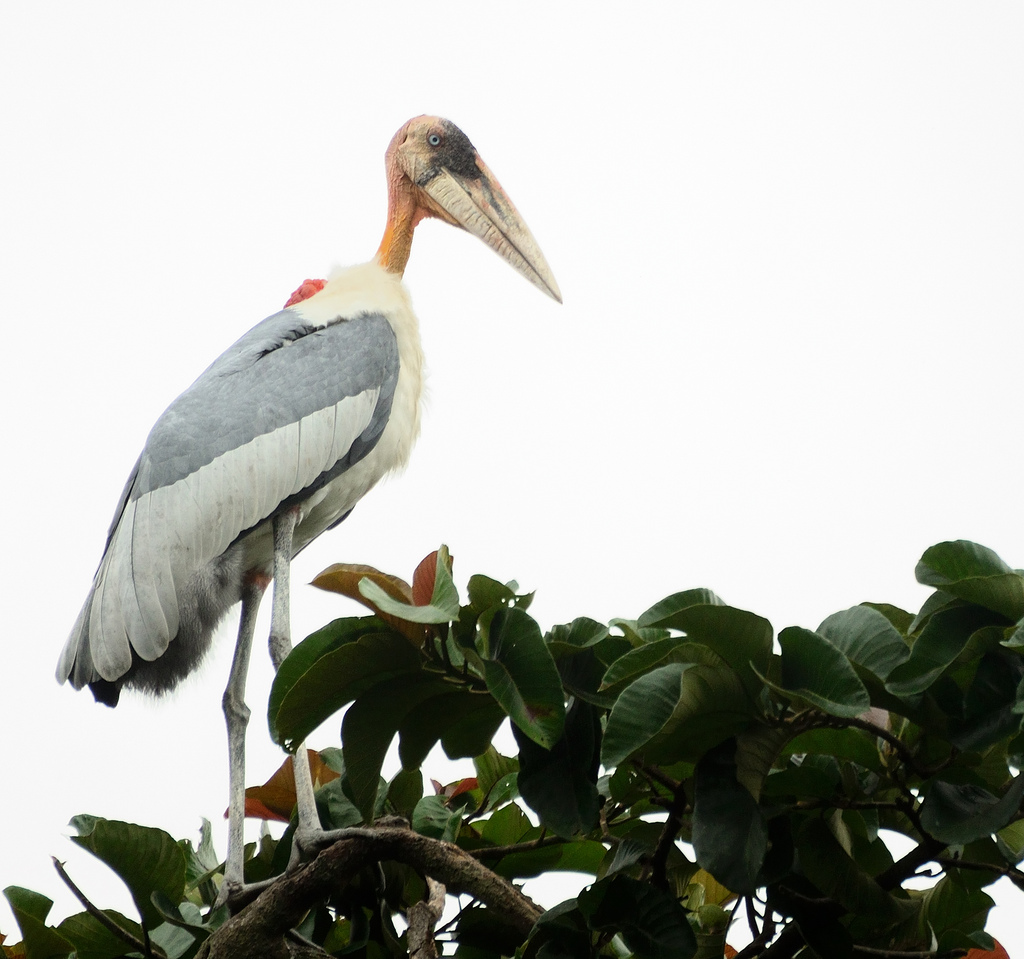
Greater adjutant

Greater adjutant (Leptoptilos dubius), a member of the stork family associated with the mythical bird Garuda, has a Rescue and Rehabilitation area located in Bhagalpur, the second largest of its kind. Loss of nesting habitat and feeding sites through drainage, pollution, and disturbance, together with hunting and egg collection, caused a massive dip in the population of the species. Garuda birds were first spotted nesting and breeding on a silk cotton tree near a village in the Ganga-Diara area in Bhagalpur in 2007. In May 2006, 42 birds were seen by the Mandar Nature Club team for the first time. Prior to this, the species had never been seen in Bihar during its breeding period. Four years after these endangered birds started nesting and breeding in Bhagalpur district, their number eventually increased, from 78 to over 500, making Bhagalpur one of only three places to host Garudas, the others being Cambodia and Assam.

The greater adjutant is classified as endangered on the IUCN Red List 2004 of threatened species and listed under Schedule IV of the Indian Wildlife (Protection) Act, 1972. This huge stork has a naked pink head, a very thick yellow bill, and a low-hanging neck pouch. The neck ruff is white. The bird looks like a vulture. Other than the pale grey edge on each wing, the rest of the greater adjutant's body is dark grey. Younglings have a narrower bill, thicker down on the head and neck, and entirely dark wings. A Garuda bird measures 145–150 cm (about three feet) in length and four to five feet in height.

=== Climate ===
Climate data for Bhagalpur (1991–2020, extremes 1901–2020)
Month	Jan	Feb	Mar	Apr	May	Jun	Jul	Aug	Sep	Oct	Nov	Dec	Year
Record high °C (°F)	31.9 (89.4)	35.8 (96.4)	43.2 (109.8)	45.3 (113.5)	46.4 (115.5)	46.0 (114.8)	42.3 (108.1)	39.7 (103.5)	38.6 (101.5)	40.0 (104.0)	37.4 (99.3)	32.2 (90.0)	46.4 (115.5)
Mean daily maximum °C (°F)	21.5 (70.7)	26.6 (79.9)	32.8 (91.0)	37.4 (99.3)	37.4 (99.3)	36.0 (96.8)	33.3 (91.9)	33.3 (91.9)	32.8 (91.0)	32.3 (90.1)	28.7 (83.7)	23.7 (74.7)	31.3 (88.3)
Mean daily minimum °C (°F)	12.2 (54.0)	15.8 (60.4)	20.7 (69.3)	24.6 (76.3)	26.5 (79.7)	27.4 (81.3)	27.3 (81.1)	27.3 (81.1)	26.6 (79.9)	24.3 (75.7)	19.2 (66.6)	14.4 (57.9)	22.0 (71.6)
Record low °C (°F)	4.2 (39.6)	5.0 (41.0)	10.8 (51.4)	13.1 (55.6)	14.5 (58.1)	19.5 (67.1)	22.4 (72.3)	20.1 (68.2)	21.5 (70.7)	15.4 (59.7)	11.1 (52.0)	3.9 (39.0)	3.9 (39.0)
Average rainfall mm (inches)	12.3 (0.48)	9.9 (0.39)	11.2 (0.44)	25.4 (1.00)	84.1 (3.31)	176.2 (6.94)	294.5 (11.59)	239.1 (9.41)	223.3 (8.79)	75.2 (2.96)	4.9 (0.19)	5.6 (0.22)	1,161.6 (45.73)
Average rainy days	1.2	1.1	1.0	2.1	4.5	8.0	13.9	11.5	9.6	3.0	0.4	0.4	56.6
Average relative humidity (%) (at 17:30 IST)	73	61	50	48	57	68	78	78	77	73	69	73	67
Source: India Meteorological Department

== Demographics ==
Historical Population of Municipal Corporation
Year	Pop.	±%
1872	65,377	—
1881	68,238	+4.4%
1891	69,106	+1.3%
1901	75,760	+9.6%
1911	74,349	−1.9%
1921	68,878	−7.4%
1931	83,847	+21.7%
1941	93,254	+11.2%
1951	114,530	+22.8%
1961	143,850	+25.6%
1971	172,202	+19.7%
1981	225,062	+30.7%
1991	253,225	+12.5%
2001	340,767	+34.6%
2011	400,146	+17.4%
Source: District Census Handbook

As of the 2011 India census, the Bhagalpur Urban Agglomeration has a population of 410,210, of which 218,284 were males and 191,926 were females. It is the 3rd largest city in Bihar in terms of urban population. The total population in the age group of 0 to 6 years is 55,898. The total number of literates are 286,125, with 160,720 males and 125,405 females. The effective literacy rate of the 7+ population is 80.76%, of which the male literacy rate is 84.95% and the women's rate is at 75.95%.

=== Religion ===
Hinduism is the majority religion in Bhagalpur City with about 70% of the population following it, than followed by Islam with 29% adherents. It also has a small minority of Jains and Christians.

=== Language ===
Bhagalpur is a geographical landmark, which is at the convergence of Bihar, Jharkhand, and West Bengal. Historically the capital of Anga Pradesh and a nation of independence by Tilkamanjhi, it has been a land of emerging languages and cultures. A fair number of Biharis, Bengalis, Marwaris, Muslims, Santhalis, and Pahadiyas reside in the region, making it a language and cultural hub.

The Angika language is primarily spoken in the district. Apart from Angika, Hindi, Bengali, Urdu, and Santhali are prominent languages of the region. It is a multilingual district and has been a centre of development for many languages during the ancient era in the Vikramshila University.

== Culture ==
Bhagalpur has a long lasting legacy of rich culture and traditions. The ancient city of Champanagari is known for its silk industry and trade. The city has richness in its festivals, art, food, and trade. The "Aangi" or "Angika" culture is followed in this region. It also is a homeland of multicultural community. Being one of the important centres of Anga, then Bengal, and now Bihar, it has grasped, respected, and promoted the cultures and traditions and thus empowered and maintained its richness.

=== Kali Puja ===
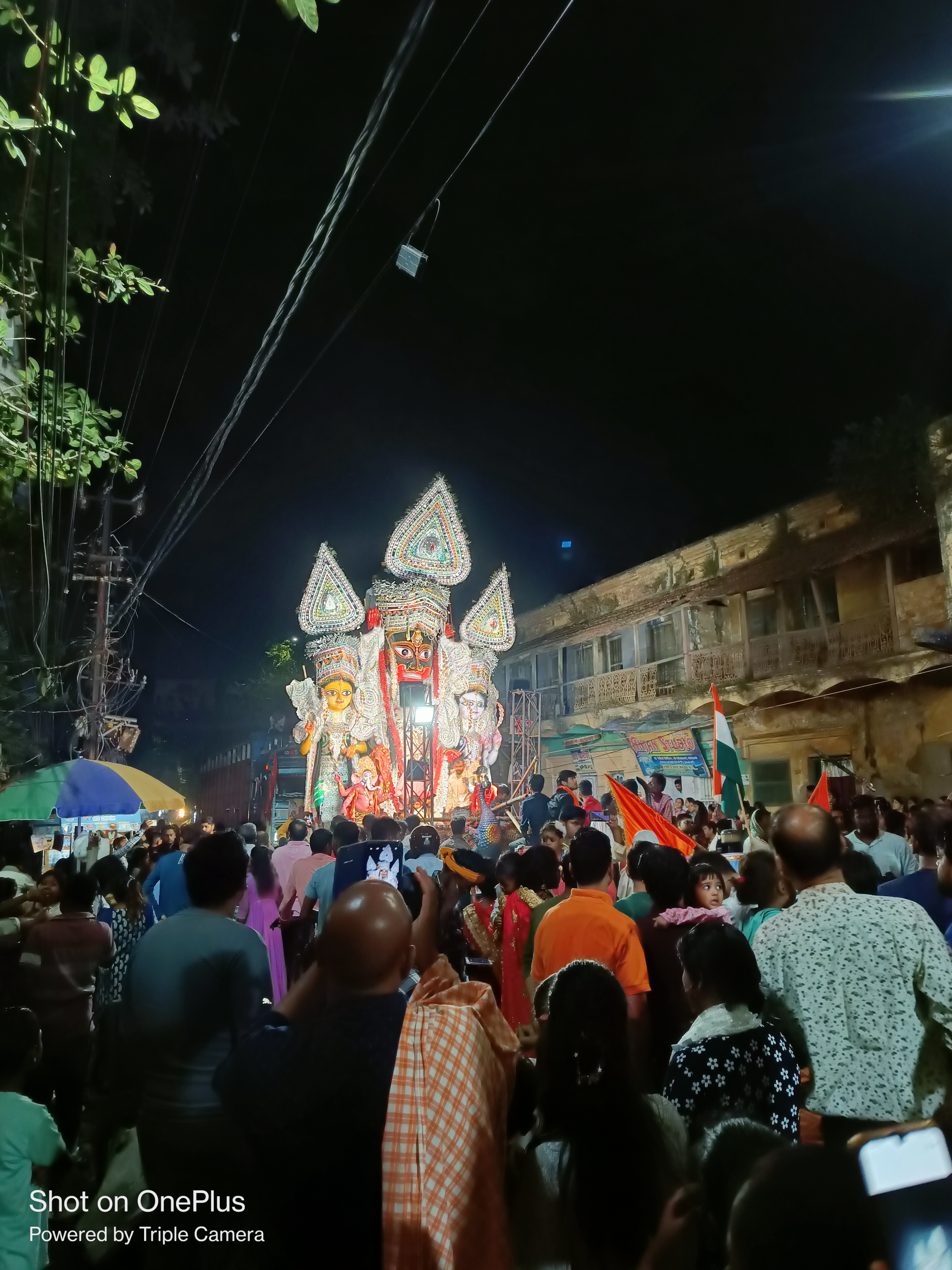
Kali Puja celebration in Bhagalpur

Kali Puja is one of the most important festivals in and around the region. Several Kali Temples and Puja Mandaps are decked up on Deepawali to worship Kalika. The procession after the Puja is so long that it takes 36 hours to complete one big phase of Murti Bisarjan. The Shobhayatra of Bhagalpur Kali Puja celebrated its 71st year in 2024. Kali Puja holds the cultural significance of the Anga Region. The procession after the Puja is the intangible cultural asset to the city.

=== Behula Bishari ===
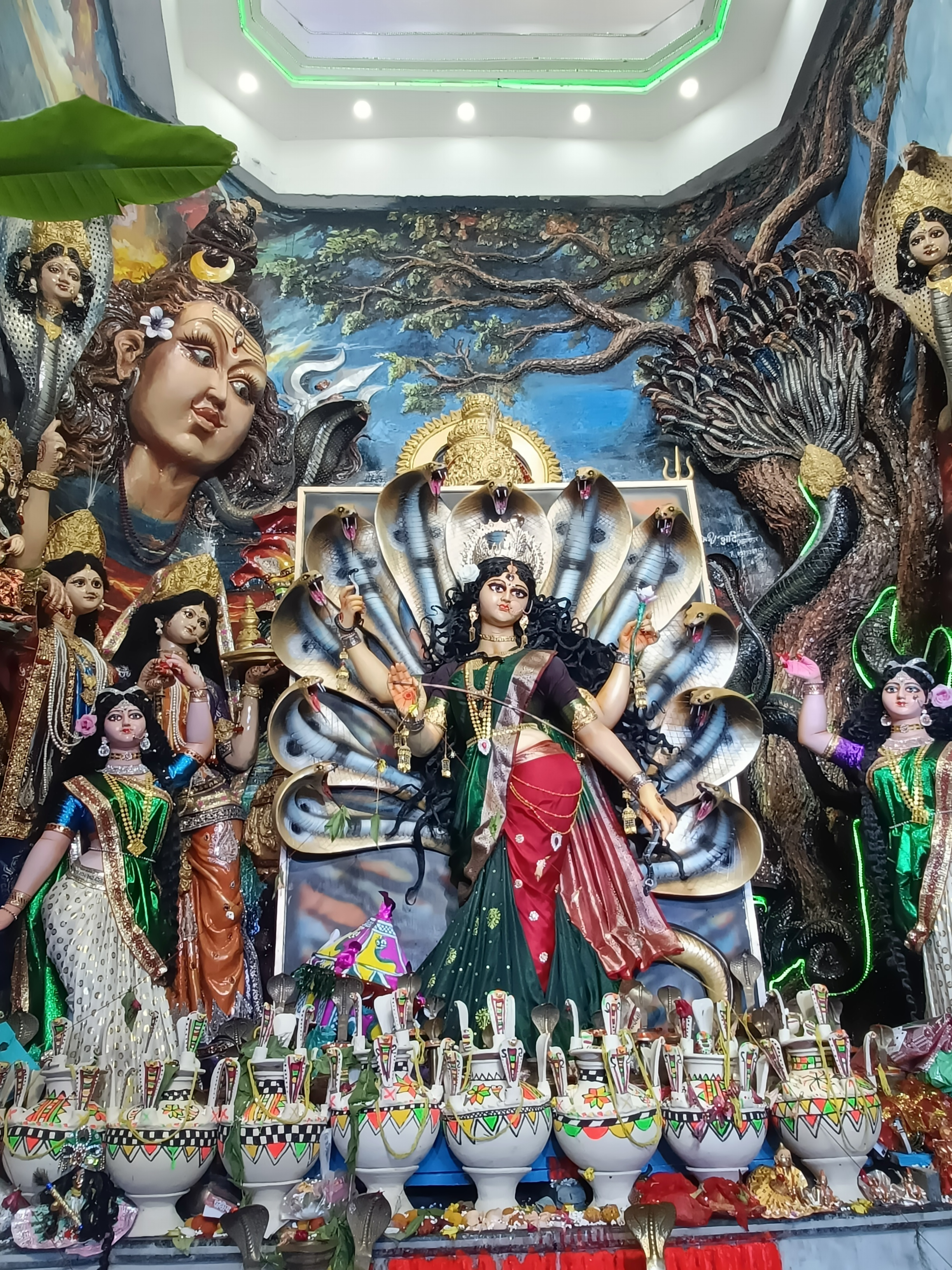
This is an image of cultural festival of Bhagalpur

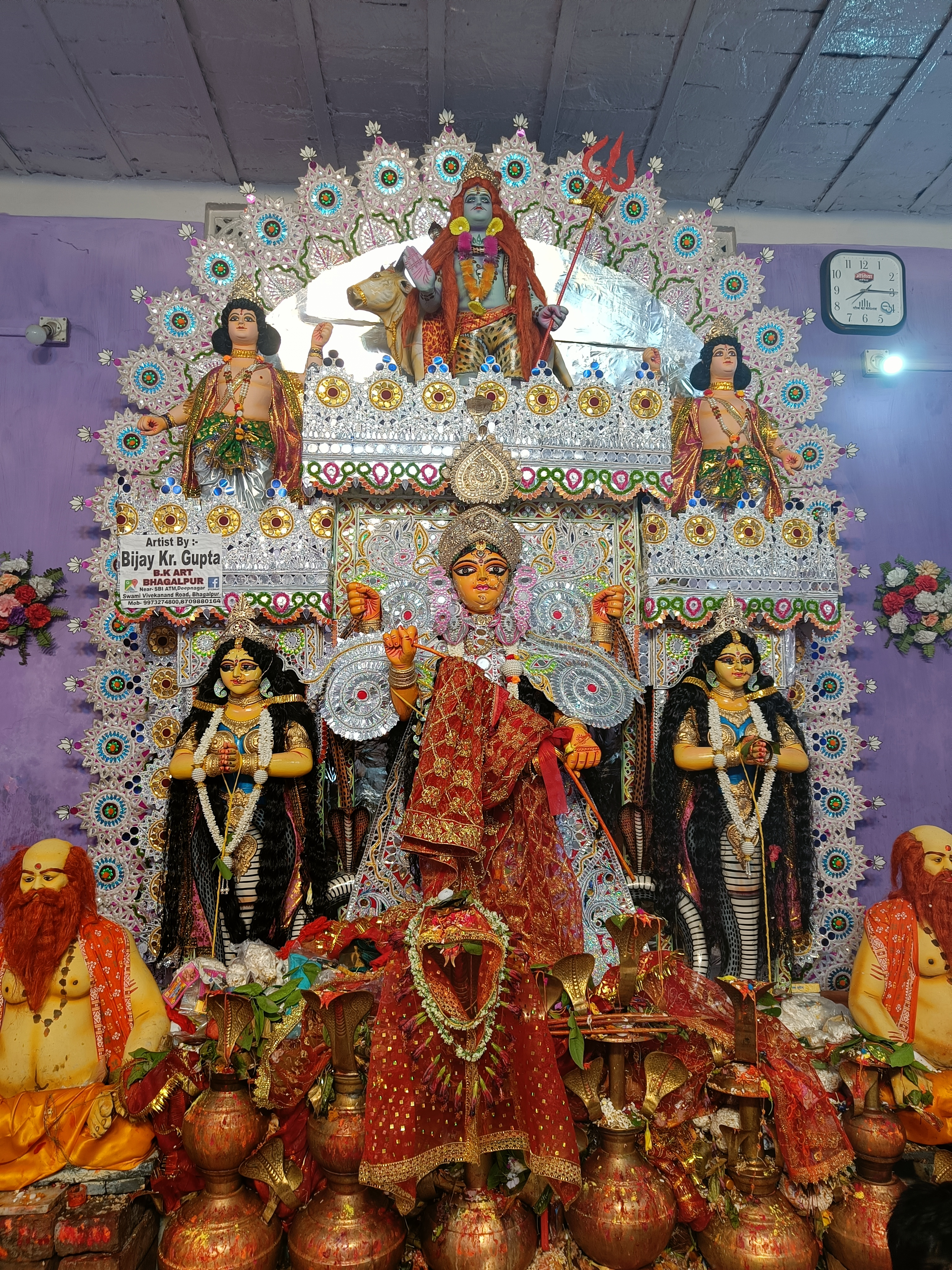
Manasa Puja at Deepnagar Chowk, Bhagalpur

Manasa, popularly known as "Bishari Puja", is a folk festival of Bhagalpur, started from Champapuri, the capital city of Anga Mahajanapada. The festival celebrates the renunciation of the Guardian Goddess, Maa Mansa. The city also commemorates the wedding of Behula and Lakhinder every year during puja.

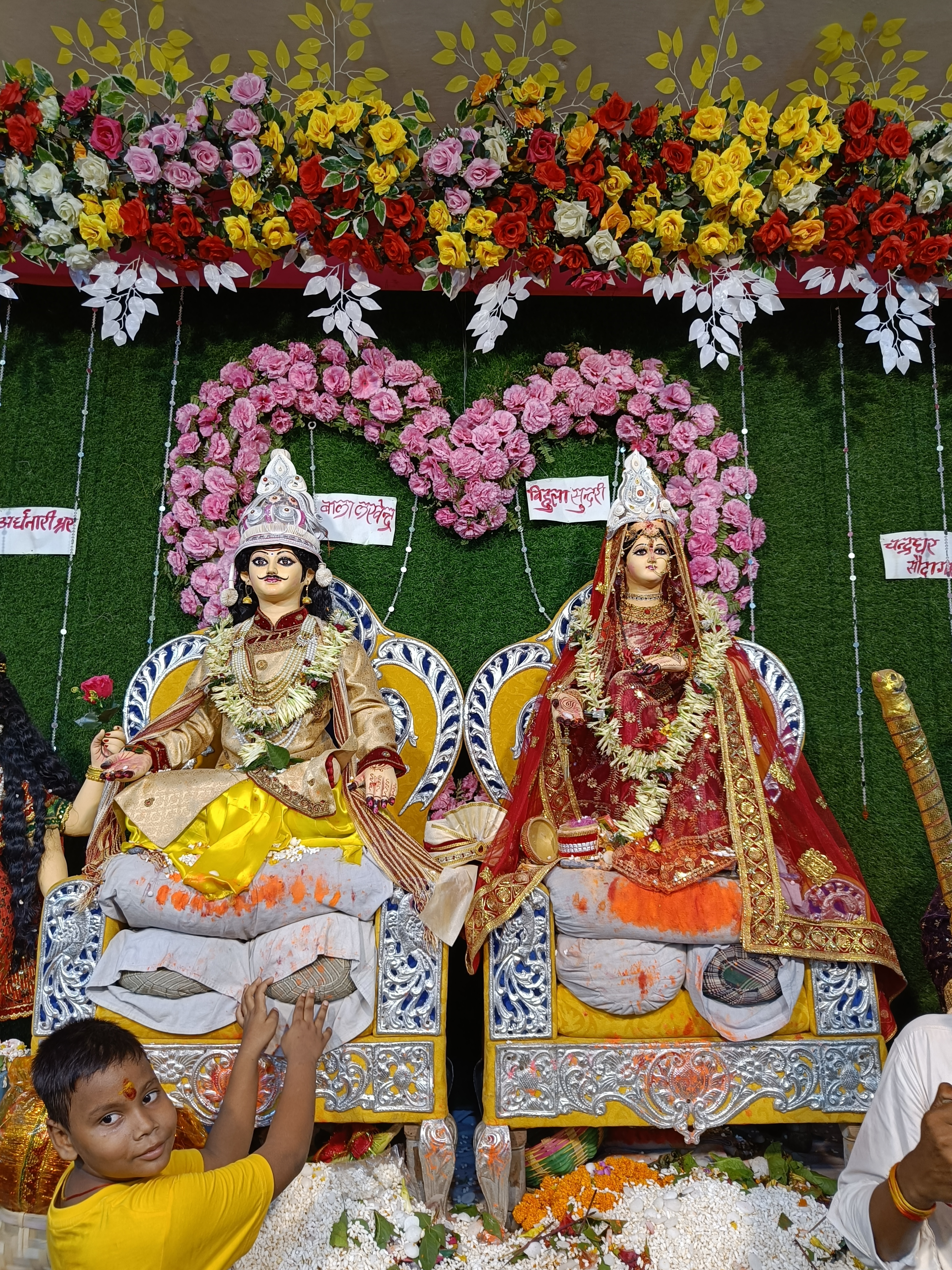
Behula and Lakhinder at Champanagar Manasa Temple, Bhagalpur

In medieval Bengali literature, Mansamangal, Behula is projected as heroine and a goddess. In the period from the thirteenth to the eighteenth centuries, many works based on this story were produced. The religious purpose of these works was to render the importance of goddess Manasa, but these works are more known for the pious love of Behula and her husband Lakhander (Lakhindar or Lakshinder). Local women sing folk songs in Angika and offer Manjusha to the Goddess. However, this is not just a mythological story, the evidence of the metal house created by Vishvakarma on order of Chand Saudagar for Behula and her husband Lakhender to protect from snake bite is still seen and reported when there is heavy rain in the region.

=== Saraswati Puja ===
Saraswati Puja is big festival celebrated with zest and enthusiasm. It is celebrated on "Basant Panchami", which is locally called "Shree Panchami". It worships Maa Bagdevi, the goddess of knowledge, art, and all sciences. The city goes artistic and is decked up with Pandals and lights, welcoming the beloved deity of the students, teachers, and artisans.

=== Durga Puja ===
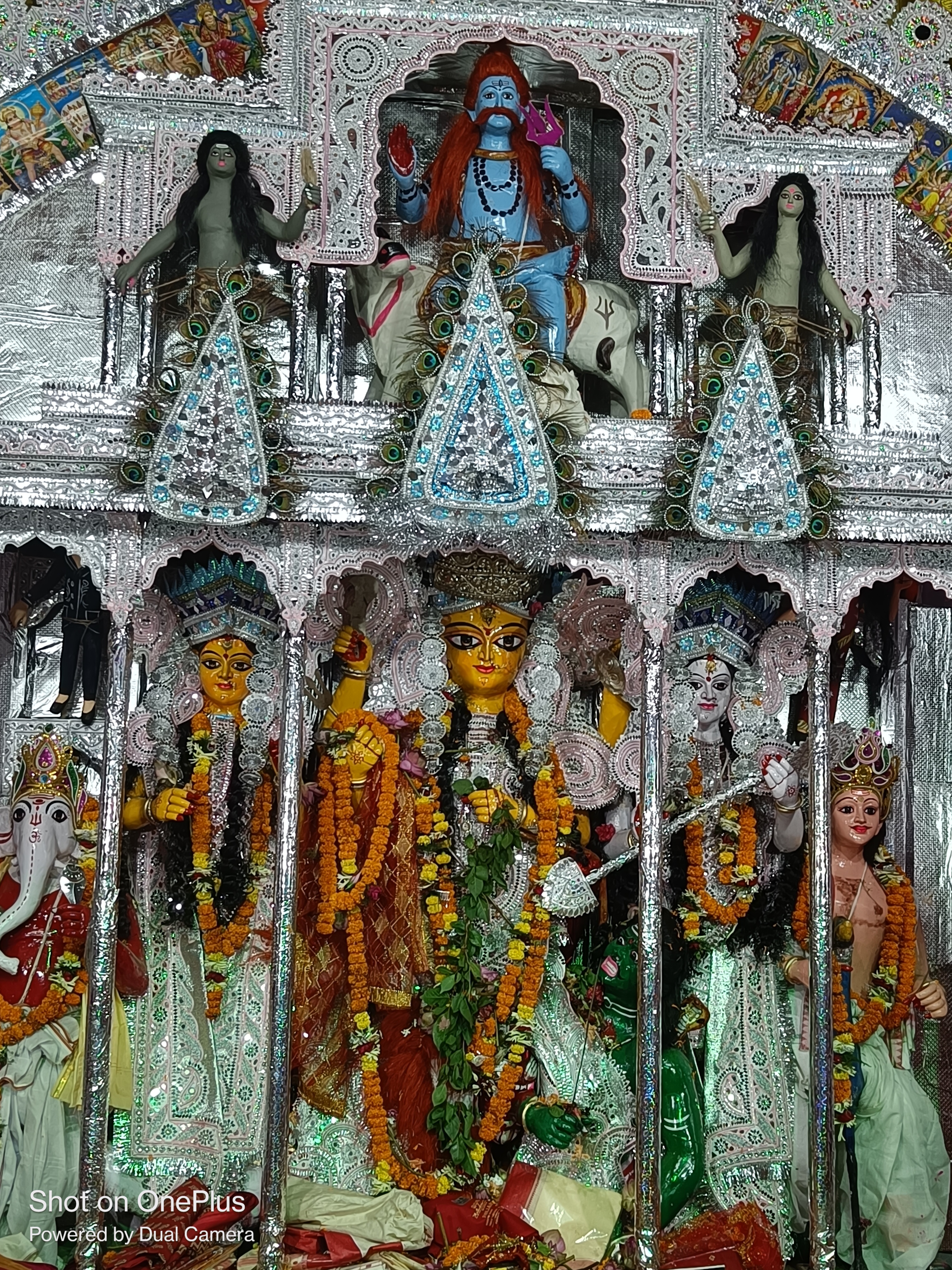
Mahashay Deori, Champanagar, Bhagalpur

Durga Puja is celebrated in Bhagalpur with pomp and show. Both the Aangi- Bihari and Bengali communities celebrate the puja with great enthusiasm. The puja Pandals are decked up by Shasthi and idols of the Goddess is installed by Vedic chants and "Belbhorni Puja". Some of the prominent puja communities include Mahashay Deori, which dates back to more than 400 years of celebration, Jubak Sangha, Sarkarbari, Kalibari, Durga Bari, Hind-e-Yuva club, Satkar Club, Housing Board colony, etc. It is the time when localites buy new clothes, visits Pandals, eat delicacies, and spend time with friends and families.

=== Chhath Puja ===
Chhath Puja, like the rest of the Bihar, is celebrated with great devotion in Bhagalpur. The festival is prominent as Bhagalpur is a city on the banks of river Ganga. Devotees throng here to worship "Goddess Shasthi" or "Chhathi maiya" and "Surya".

=== Bisua/Baisakkha ===
Bisua or Baisakkha marks the new beginning in the Anga region. It is a new year festivity celebrated during 14–15 April every year. It is the welcoming of summer. On Bisua, locals install holy pitchers with mango leaves and a raw mango on the top, and keep it at Puja Ghar, temples, above tulsi plant and Shivilinga. Lots of delicacies like Daal Puri, Raspua, Thekua, Daal paratha, Guramma (sweet and tangy raw mango chutney), Bari jhol, and Bhaat are made and eaten. Barley Sattu, Jaggery, Raw mango, and seasonal fruits are offered to the Gods. The next day, cooking is avoided and "Paniyota Bhaat" (similar to Panta bhaat of Bengal and Pakhala of Odisha) is consumed. Sweets and fruits are distributed and a lavish meal, usually fish or mutton, is prepared at night. It is similar to "Satuani" of Purvanchal region, "Jur Shital" of Mithilanchal, "Pohela Boisakh" of Bengal, and "Mahabisuba Sankranti" of Odisha.

== Local Attraction ==
=== Vikramshila Mahavihara ===
Vikramshila Mahavihara's ruins have been excavated at Antichak village in Bhagalpur. It was established by Emperor Dharmapala of the Pala Empire. It was an international centre of learning that focussed on multiple fields of knowledge, including Tantricism. It was considered at par with Nalanda university as it was a flourishing university. However, Bhaktiyar Khilji destroyed it and left it to ash and ruin. It has been recently recognised by the government with the excavation at the site.

=== Mansa Temple, Champanagar Tanti Bazar ===
Mansa Mandir, situated in the old quarters of Champanagar locality, is one of the important pilgrimage sites of the city. Dedicated to Goddess Bishari (Mansa), this site is believed to be the place where Chandradhar Saudagar offered puja to the Goddess for the first time. Every year, during 16–18 August, thousands of devotees throng here to commemorate the wedding of Behula and Lakhinder. The temple replicated the scene of Behula- Bishari gatha during the festival. Large sized Manjusha are offered to the Goddess and is submerged in the holy Champa river, near the temple.

=== Dharhara ===
Dharhara village, located at Naugachia of Bhagalpur, is known for a local tradition in which at least ten fruit-bearing trees, primarily mango and lychee, are planted upon the birth of every girl child. This custom, which has led to the village being called the "Reformist Village," has increased the tree canopy. Visitors come to see these orchards which also serve as economic security for the daughters, and experience the Angika culture centered around the ancient Thakurbari Temple and the Sonaiya Pokhar lake managed by Thakurbari Temple Trust.

=== Budhanath Temple ===
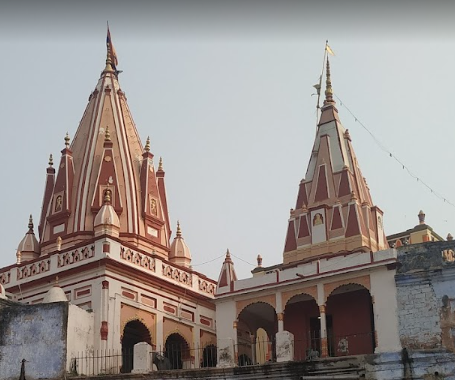
Budhanath Temple, one of 108 Nath temples in India mentioned in Shiva Purana

Spread over three acres, Budhanath Temple is located on the banks of the Uttarvahini Ganga (flowing from south to north) River. Being one of the oldest temples in the region, it witnesses influx of devotees throughout the year. It is about twenty minutes from the main town. Reference of Baba Budhanath can be found in Shiva Purana as Baba Bal Vridheshwarnath. Also, this name has been stated in the first segment of the eighth segments of Shiva Purana. The lingam of this place of worship is self-incarnated nevertheless as to when it came into being is still unknown. Idol of Ma Bhavani can be seen beside the Shivalinga or Lingam.

=== Shri Champapur Digamber Jain Temple ===
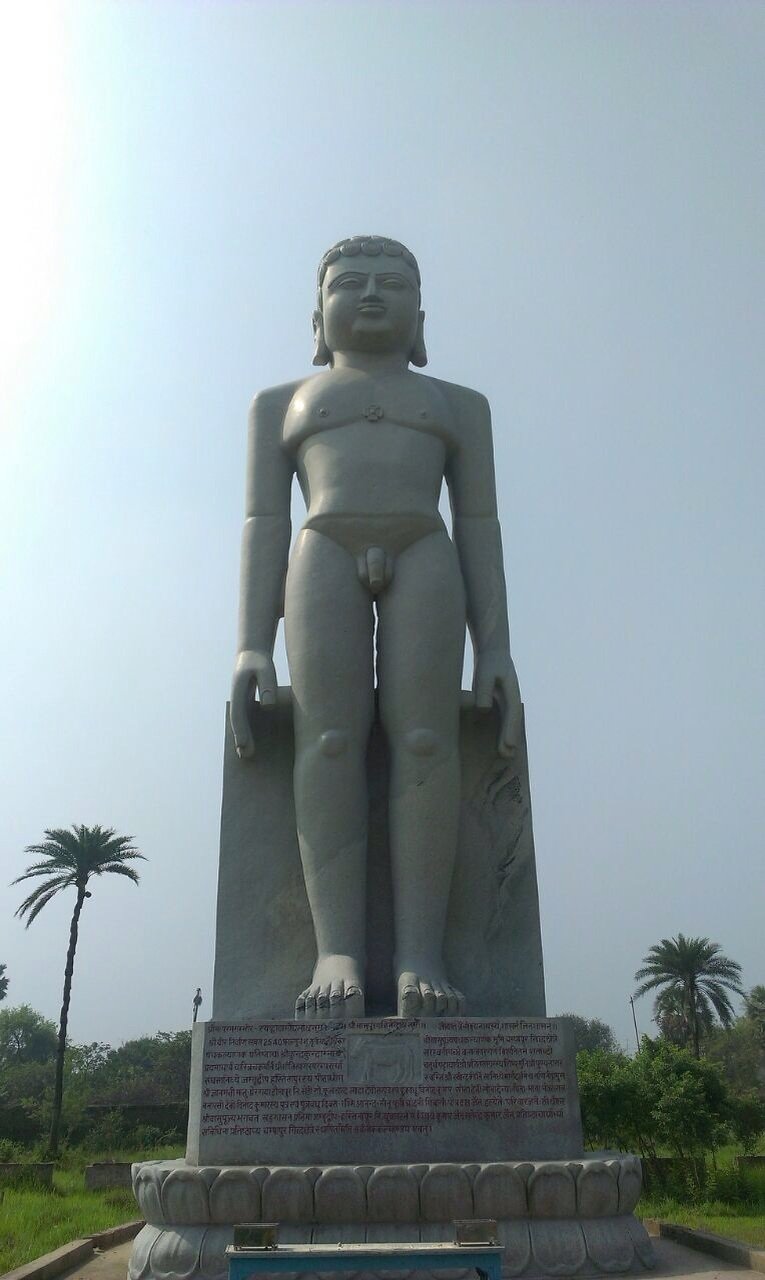
The tallest statue of Lord Vasupujya, Champapur

Champapur is an ancient and historic Teerth Kshetra of Jainism. It is the place where all the five Kalyanaks, Garbha, Janam, Tapa, KevalGyan, and Moksha Kalyanak of Bhagwan Vasupujya, the 12th Jain Teerthankar, have taken place. Champapur was the capital of Anga Janpada, one of the 52 Janapadas established by Adi Teerthankar Bhagwan Rishabh Deo. Champapur also existed as Mahajanapada among the six Mahajanapadas during the time of Bhagwan Mahavira Swami.

The three Chaturmas of Bhagwan Mahavira Swami during his Dikshakal, religious propagation centre of Anga-Banga-Magadh-Vaishali, test of modesty of Sati Subhadra and Anantmati, Aahardan to Bhagwan Mahaveer Swami by Sati Chandan Bala have taken place in Champapur. Champapur is also related to great stories of 'origin of Harivansha, Shripal-Mainasundari, Shri Dharma Ghosh Muni, King Karna of Mahabharata, King Mudrak and great architect Vishvakarman'.

The main temple of Champapur Siddha Kshetra is about 2500 years old. This temple, being symbolic of 'Panch Kalyanaka', is adorned with 5 altars, magnificent spire, and 2 columns of fame. It is said that there were 4 'Columns of Fame (Keerti Stambha)' which existed in four corners of the campus of the temple. Later on, 2 out of 4 were destroyed in the earthquake of year 1934 and repair (Jirnoddhar) of other 2 columns was done in 1938. The 'Columns of Fame' are about 2200 years old.

=== Khanqah-e-Shahbazia ===
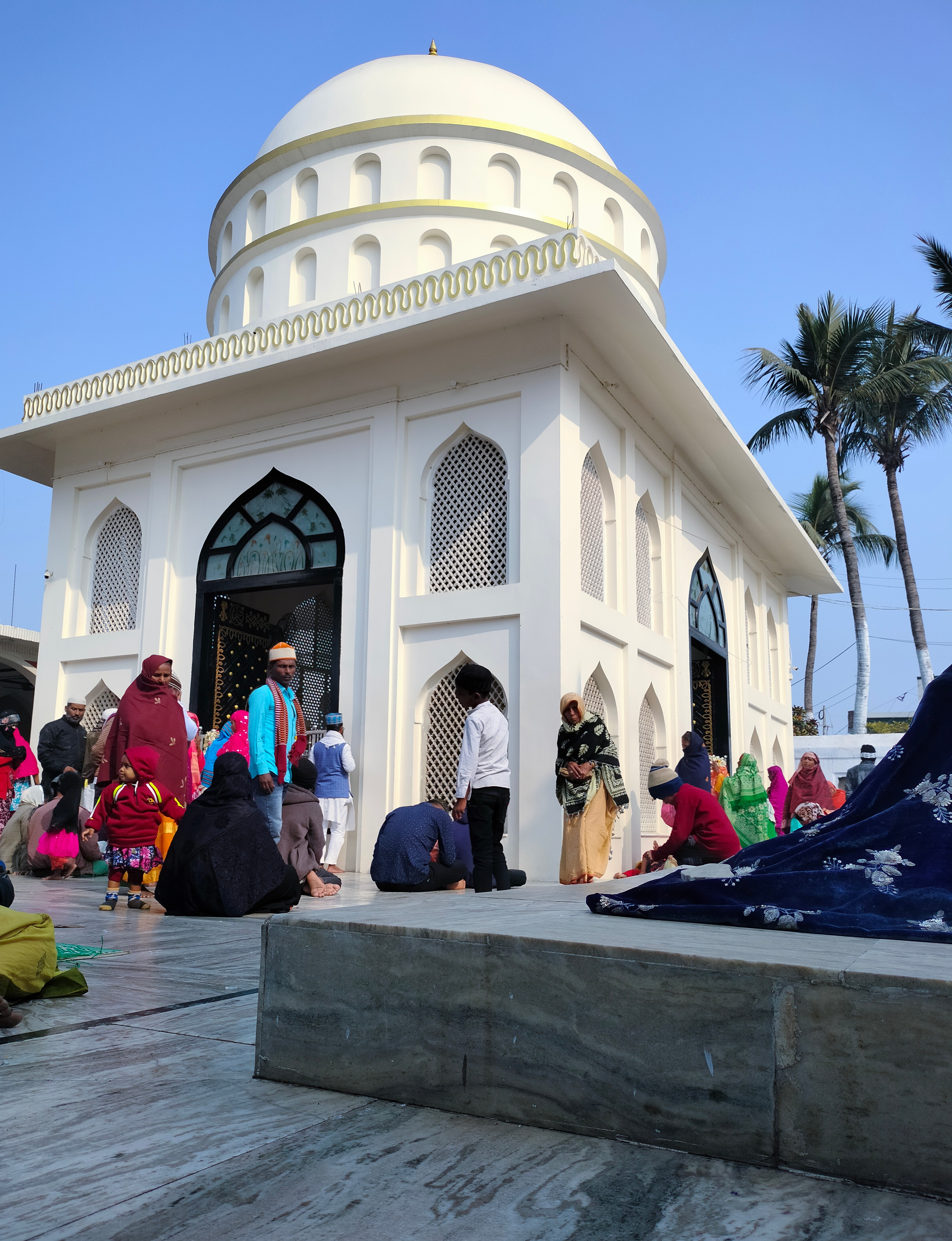
The Aastana (shrine) of the 16th-century Sufi saint Maulana Shahbaz Muhammad, in Bhagalpur, Bihar, India

Founded in 1577 AD, the Khanqah-e-Shahbazia is one of the most revered shrines of Bhagalpur. It houses the grave of Maulana Shahbaz Muhammad, a saint whose 13th-generation descendants still run the place. Maulana Shahbaz Muhammad Rahmatullah is considered one of the 40 Sufi saints sent to spread the message of Allah. The Sajjadah Nasheen (direct descendant of the saint) is supposed to spend his life within the confines of the Khanqah and take care of its management, lead prayers, and offer spiritual services. It is said that they are exempted from appearing in a court of law.

The Mosque was built by Aurangzeb and was frequently visited by him. Every Thursday, visitors assemble at the place to be blessed. Most of the visitors are said to be from the eastern parts of India and Bangladesh. There is a belief that the water in a pond here has medicinal qualities that can cure illness and snake bites. The Archeological Survey of India has discovered some ancient manuscripts from the basement of Khanqah e Shahbazia.

The Khanqah is also famous for its library, which has a vast collection of Arabic and Persian theological texts, including a copy of the Qur'an transcribed by Murshid Quli Khan, the Nawab of Murshidabad, Bengal.

=== Ghats in Bhagalpur ===
The ghats of Bhagalpur are riverfront steps and embankments situated along the banks of the Ganga River in the Bhagalpur district. These ghats serve as important cultural, spiritual, and social spaces, playing a vital role in the daily lives of residents. They are especially significant during major Hindu festivals such as Shravani Mela, Chhath Puja, Maghi Purnima, Shravan Somvari, and Makar Sankranti, when thousands gather for ritual bathing, prayers, and offerings to "Surya".

The most prominent ghats in Bhagalpur, ranked by religious significance, crowd density during major festivals like Chhath Puja and Sawan, and cultural heritage, include Barari Pul Ghat, which remains the largest and most frequented; Budhanath Ghat, closely linked with the historic Budhanath Temple; and Barari Sidhi Ghat, known for its grand staircase and proximity to the Radha Krishna octagonal temple. Other important ghats are Khanjarpur Ghat (SM College Ghat), Hanuman Ghat with its old temple heritage, and Manik Sarkar Ghat, which is particularly crowded during Shravan. Additionally, Pipli Dham Ghat, Jogsar Ghat, Khirni Ghat, and the emerging Babupur Ghat (now part of the urban zone after city expansion) also hold notable significance for ritual bathing and religious gatherings. These ghats collectively reflect the devotional and historical richness of the Ganga riverfront in Bhagalpur.

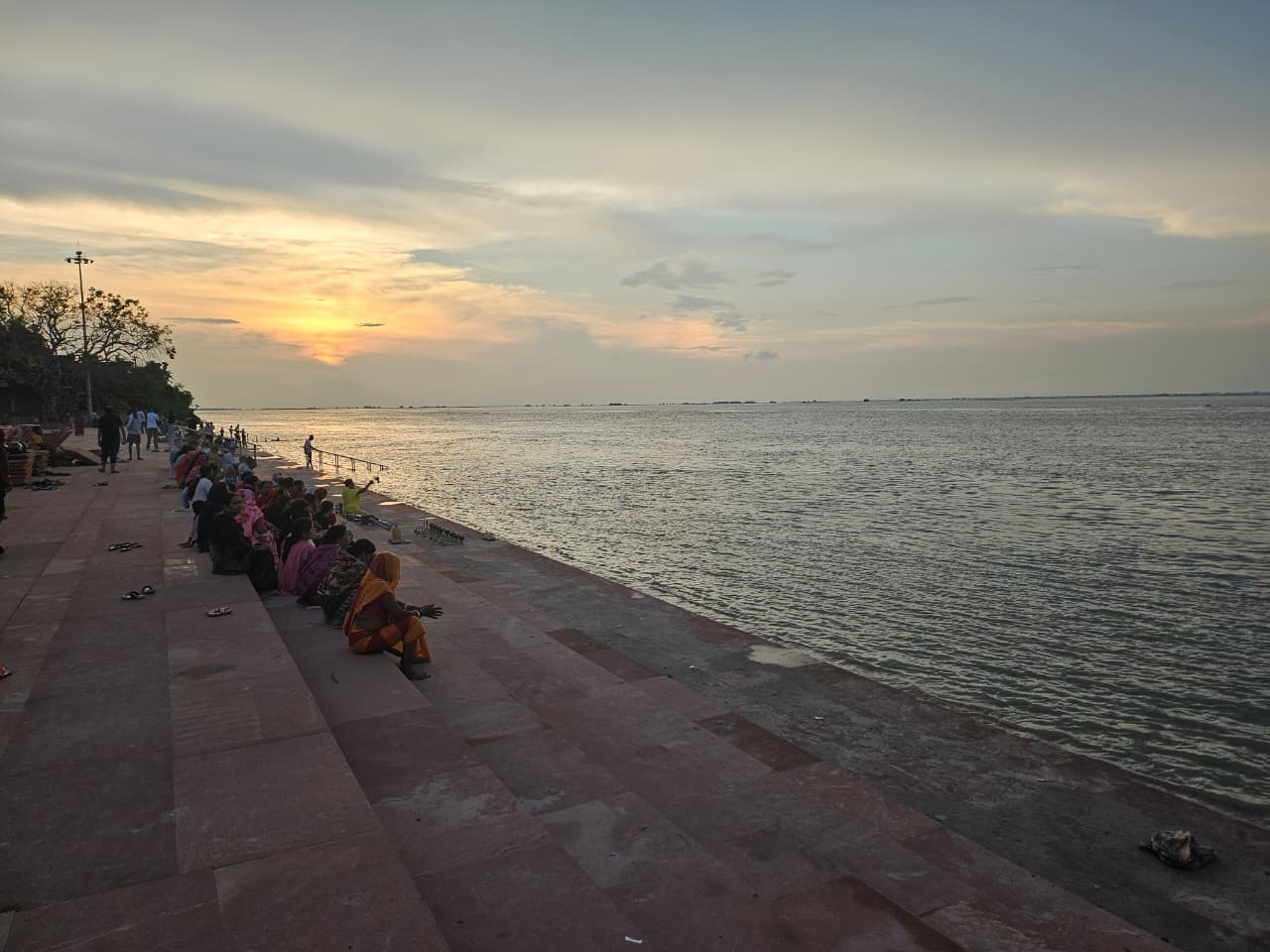
Ganga Aarti at Seedhi Ghat

== River ==
There are many rivers which cross the Bhagalpur Border. They are:

1. Ganga River- The Ganga is the most sacred river in India. It flows through Bhagalpur.
2. Kosi River: The Koshi River, also known as the "Sorrow of Bihar," is a major river that flows near Bhagalpur.
3. Chanan River: An important river which flows through Bhagalpur and Banka Districts of Bihar, the adjoining area is known as Chanan Basin and is famous for the Katarni Rice.

== Education ==
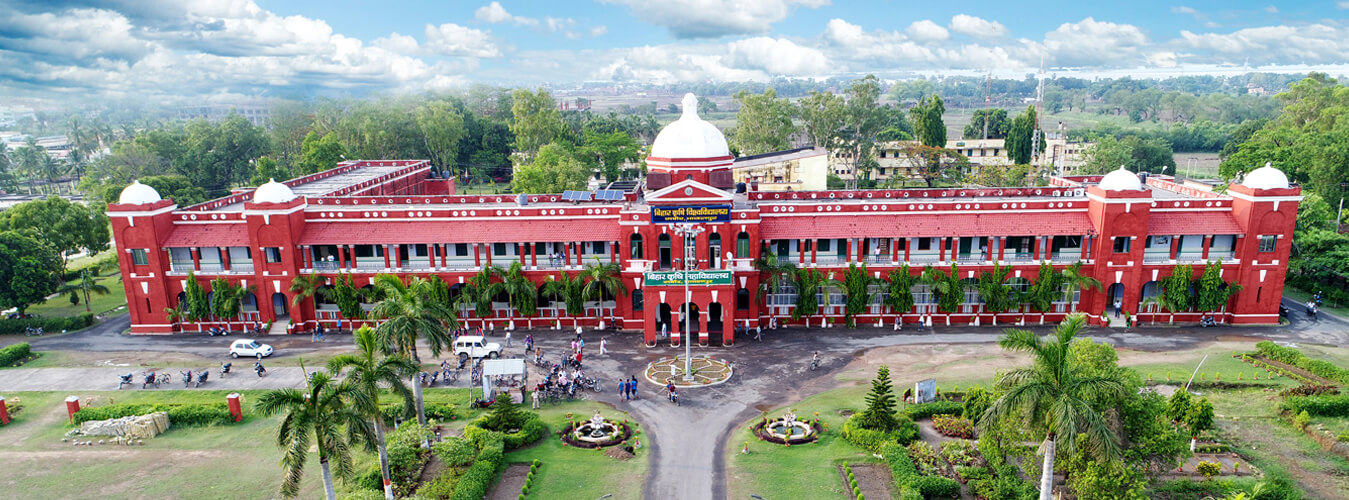
Bihar Agricultural University

- Indian Institute of Information Technology (IIIT), Bhagalpur
- Bihar Agricultural University (BAU), Sabour, Bhagalpur
- Tilka Manjhi Bhagalpur University (TMBU), Bhagalpur
- Central Institute of Petrochemicals Engineering and Technology-CSTS, Bhagalpur
- NTPC Kahalgaon, Bhagalpur
- Software Technology Park (STPI), Bhagalpur
- Vikramshila Central University, Bhagalpur (proposed)
- Bhagalpur College of Engineering (BCE), Bhagalpur
- D.A.V. Public School
- Saint Joseph's School
- Mount Assisi School
- Mount Carmel School
- T.N.B. College, Bhagalpur

== Media ==
Print media include the Hindi Dainik Jagran, Dainik Bhaskar, Aaj, Hindustan (under Hindustan Times), and Prabhat Khabar; the Urdu The Inquilab and Taasir, while English Times of India, The Telegraph, and Hindustan Times are also available.

Broadcast media include All India Radio (Frequency 1458 kHz, 1206 kHz) 90.4 FM Radio Active (Bhagalpur) and AIR FM Rainbow India 100.1.M, sadhna plus news channel.

Telecommunications services include BSNL, Airtel, Vodafone Idea, and Reliance Jio.

Airtel, Jio, BSNL, and Sify are providing broadband services in this region.

== Notable people ==
- Anand Mohan Sahay – General Secretary in INA with Netaji. Ambassador in seven different countries
- Aisha Sharma – Actress, Bollywood, Sister of Neha Sharma
- Ajit Pal Mangat – Indian film director
- Ajit Sharma – Member of Bihar Legislative Assembly from Bhagalpur constituency
- Alexander Dow – Died at Bhagalpur was an orientalist, writer, playwright and army officer in the East India Company
- Aparajita Sarangi – Member of Parliament and IAS officer who brought in Bhagalpur
- Ashis Nandy – Indian political psychologist, a social theorist, and a contemporary cultural and political critic
- Ashok Kumar – Hindi Indian movie actor
- Ashwini Kumar Choubey – BJP politician. Ex health minister of Bihar
- B. J. Choubey – Professor in the Tilka Manjhi Bhagalpur University
- Balai Chand Mukhopadhyay – Pen name Banaphool, Bengali writer
- Bhagwat Jha Azad – Former Chief minister of Bihar
- Buddhadev Das Gupta – Indian classical musician
- Chandan Kushwaha, IPS officer of Bihar cadre
- Chunchun Prasad Yadav – Three consecutive times MP from Bhagalpur
- Dibyendu Palit – Bengali writer
- Diwakar Prasad Singh, Former Member of Legislative Council, Former Minister of Education, Bihar
- Francis David Millet Brown – British Indian Army officer
- George Francis Brown – East India Company, and Commissioner of Bhagalpur
- George Heenan – New Zealand cricketer, schoolteacher and geologist
- Gorelal Manishi – Social activist and writer
- Gurmeet Choudhary – Indian television actor, model and dancer
- Kadambini Ganguly – Daughter of Braja Kishore Bose, headmaster of Bhagalpur School, was India's one of the first women graduates and Doctor was born in Bhagalpur
- Lutfur Rahman – Urdu poet
- Maharani Chakravorty – Indian molecular biologist
- Marco della Tomba – Italian missionary, died in Bhagalpur
- Maulana Shahbaz Muhammad – 16th-century Sufi saint, theologian, and Islamic scholar from Bhagalpur, Bihar
- Mehi – Sant Mat saint
- Muhammad Sahool Bhagalpuri – Muslim scholar
- Nandalal Bose – Artist
- Neha Sharma – Hindi & South-Indian movie actress
- Nishikant Dubey
- Pritish Nandy – Poet, painter, journalist, politician, television personality, animal activist and film producer
- Rabindra Kumar Rana – Politician, Member of the 14th Lok Sabha
- Raj Kamal Jha – Chief Editor, The Indian Express; author and novelist
- Rajesh Verma (Khagaria politician)
- Ramjee Singh – Book edited - Gandhi's centenary number, T.N.B . college, Bhagalpur University, 1970
- Raveesh Kumar – Indian ambassador to Finland, former spokesperson of Ministry of External Affairs in Government of India
- Saeedullah Khan – Deputy Chief of Air Staff Pakistan Air Force
- Sanjay Jha – Former CEO of Global Foundries
- Saratchandra Chattopadhyay – Famous Bengali novelist. The novel Srikanth is based on Bhagalpur
- Shashi Prasad Singh – Freedom fighter and former General Secretary of the Bhagalpur District Congress Committee; martyred during the Quit India Movement
- Suchitra Bhattacharya – Acclaimed Indian novelist was born in Bhagalpur on 10 January 1950
- Syed Shahnawaz Hussain – BJP leader
- Tapan Sinha – Film director
- Tilka Manjhi – First Santhal freedom fighter
- William St Clair Grant – Scottish cricketer, born in Bhaugulpore, Bengal, India
- William Vansittart – British politician born in Bhagalpur

== Regional/Zonal offices in Bhagalpur ==
- India Post East Region Bhagalpur
- Zonal Accounts Office, CBDT (Bhagalpur)
- State Bank of India
- Bank of India
- Union Bank of India
- UCO Bank
- Indian Bank (Allahabad Bank)
- Punjab National Bank Circle Office
- Airtel Zonal Office
- LIC Divisional Office
- Bihar School Examination Board
- Bihar Industrial Area Development Authority (BIADA)
- Bihar State Pollution Control Board
- Employees' Provident Fund Organisation(EPFO) Sub-Regional Office, Bhagalpur
- MSME office Bhagalpur
- Regional Forensic science laboratory
- Regional Water Treatment Laboratory
- Regional Dairy Development Office
- National Career Service(NCS) Regional office
- Environment And Forest Division Bhagalpur

== See also ==
- 1980 Bhagalpur blindings
- Aranyak
- Bhagalpur sari
