= Varsha Rani =

Indian politician

Varsha Rani (born 1985) is an Indian politician from Bihar. She was a former member of the Bihar Legislative Assembly from Bihpur Assembly constituency in Bhagalpur district. She won the 2015 Bihar Legislative Assembly election representing Rashtriya Janata Dal.

== Early life and education ==
Rani is from Bihpur, Bhagalpur district, Bihar. She married Bulo Mandal, a former MLA. She studied Class 10 and passed the examinations conducted by Bihar School of Examination Board, Patna in 2003.

== Career ==
Rani won from Bihpur Assembly constituency representing Rashtriya Janata Dal in the 2015 Bihar Legislative Assembly election. She polled 68.963 votes and defeated her nearest rival, Kumar Shailendra of the Bharatiya Janata Party, by a margin of 12,716 votes.
