= Kumar Shailendra =

Indian politician (born 1966)

Minister of Road Construction Government of Bihar
- Incumbent
- Assumed office 07 May 2026
- Chief Minister: Samrat Choudhary
- Preceded by: Samrat Choudhary(as Chief Minister)

Member of Bihar Legislative Assembly
- Incumbent
- Assumed office 10 November 2020
- Constituency: Bihpur
- In office 2010–2015
- Constituency: Bihpur

Personal details
- Party: Bharatiya Janata Party

Kumar Shailendra (born 9 December 1966) is an Indian politician from Bihar. He is an MLA from Bihpur Assembly constituency in Bhagalpur District. He won the 2020 Bihar Legislative Assembly election and 2025 Bihar Legislative Assembly election representing Bharatiya Janata Party. He is currently serving as the Minister of Road Construction of Bihar.

== Early life and education ==
Shailendra is from Bihpur, Bhagalpur District, Bihar. He is the son of Kumar Nityanand Singh. He completed his B.Sc. in engineering at Indian College of Engineering, Motihari, Bihar University in 1991.

== Career ==
Shailendra won from Bihpur Assembly constituency representing Bharatiya Janata Party in the 2020 Bihar Legislative Assembly election. He polled 72,938 votes and defeated his nearest rival and two time MLA, Shailesh Kumar Mandal of Rashtriya Janata Dal, by a margin of 6,129 votes. He first became an MLA winning the 2010 Bihar Legislative Assembly election. In 2010, he polled 48,027 votes and defeated his nearest rival, Shailesh Kumar of Rashtriya Janata Dal, by a narrow margin of 465 votes. However, he lost the 2015 Bihar Legislative Assembly election to Varsha Rani of RJD by a margin of 12,716 votes.
