= Gopal Mandal =

Indian politician

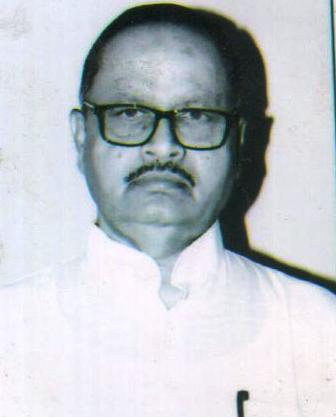

Member of Bihar Legislative Assembly
- Incumbent
- Assumed office November 2005 - 14 November 2025
- Preceded by: Amit Rana
- Succeeded by: Shailesh Kumar
- Constituency: Gopalpur

Personal details
- Born: 15 August 1964 (age 62) Gopalpur, Bhagalpur
- Party: Janata Dal (United)

Narendra Kumar Niraj (born 15 August 1964) commonly known as Gopal Mandal is an Indian politician from Bihar. He is a member of Janata Dal (United). He is a four time member of the Bihar Legislative Assembly from Gopalpur Assembly constituency in Bhagalpur district. He is considered as a staunch supporter of chief minister Nitish Kumar. He has served as Member of Bihar Legislative Assembly for four terms, winning the Assembly elections consecutively from 2005 to 2020.

== Early life and education ==
Mandal is from Gopalpur, Bhagalpur district, Bihar and is a member of Gangota community and follows Hinduism . He is the son of late Jago Mandal. He completed his B.A. at a college, affiliated with Bhagalpur University.

== Career ==
Mandal became an MLA for the first time winning the October 2005 Bihar Legislative Assembly election. He polled 48,049 votes and defeated his nearest rival, Amit Rana of RJD, by a margin of 15,012 votes. He retained the Gopalpur seat defeating the same candidate by a margin of 25,060 votes in the 2010 Bihar Legislative Assembly election. He won for the third time winning the 2015 Bihar Legislative Assembly election defeating Anil Kumar Yadav of Bharatiya Janata Party by a margin of 5,169 votes.

=== Controversies ===
==== Bar Dancer Incident 2016 ====
In 2016, Mandal was reported to be dancing with bar dancers at a marriage ceremony in Bhojpur district of Bihar. Initially he denied the allegations and said that the video was doctored but later accepted it. He clarified that he used to be an artist by birth and he just danced to entertain the people and there was nothing bad in the video. Later, he was accused by a resident of Naugachhia village, Fatoo Pandit, who alleged that Mandal beat him, for refusing to obey his orders.

==== Train Undergarment Incident ====
In 2021, a video of Mandal walking in one of the air conditioned coach of the Tejas Rajdhani express went viral. In this video he was shown walking in undergarments in the train, while travelling from Delhi to Patna. He later explained that he had a stomach ache and that's why he was refreshing himself.

==== Rivalry with Er. Shailendra and Abuse ====
In the same year, Member of Bihar Legislative Assembly engineer Shailendra filed a complaint with the Bihar Police against Mandal. He accused Mandal of making death threats against him. Mandal later organised a press conference to explain his part. Earlier, in the year 2021, Prabhat Khabar reported an incident involving the two men, pertaining to a viral audio, in which Mandal was talking to Shailendra. He seemed angry as he was not invited in a ceremony and was abusing Bhumihar caste and senior leaders of BJP including Shailendra.

==== Land Grabbing Accusations ====
In 2023, another controversy erupted over illegal construction on a disputed land of a person called Lal Bahadur Shastri. Earlier, Gopal Mandal's son Ashish Mandal was allegedly involved with the family members of Shastri over an issue of land grabbing. Later, on a complaint made by Shastri to Barari police, it was found that illegal construction was being done allegedly at the behest of Mandal.

== See also ==
- Beema Bharti
