= Gopalpur, Bihar Assembly constituency =

Constituency of the Bihar legislative assembly in India

- Constituency No. 153 for the Bihar Legislative Assembly

Constituency details
- Country: India
- Region: East India
- State: Bihar
- District: Bhagalpur
- Established: 1957
- Total electors: 276,973

Member of Legislative Assembly
- 18th Bihar Legislative Assembly
- Incumbent Shailesh Kumar Mandal
- Party: JD(U)
- Alliance: NDA
- Elected year: 2025

Gopalpur Assembly constituency is one of 243 legislative assembly constituencies of the legislative assembly of Bihar. It is a part of the Bhagalpur Lok Sabha constituency along with other assembly constituencies viz Bihpur, Pirpainti, Kahalgaon, Bhagalpur and Nathnagar. The town of Gopalpur, Bihar is part of this constituency.

== Overview ==
Gopalpur comprises CD Blocks Gopalpur, Naugachhia, Rangrachowk & Ismailpur.

== Members of the Legislative Assembly ==
Year	Name	Party
1952	Vedanand Jha	Indian National Congress
1957	Maniram Singh	Communist Party of India
1962	Maya Devi	Indian National Congress
1967	Maniram Singh	Communist Party of India
1969	Madan Prasad Singh	Indian National Congress
1972	Madan Prasad Singh	Indian National Congress
1977	Mani Ram Singh	Communist Party of India
1980	Madan Prasad Singh	Indian National Congress (I)
1985	Madan Prasad Singh	Indian National Congress
1990	Gyaneshwar Prasad Yadav	Bharatiya Janata Party
1995	Rabindra Rana	Janata Dal
2000	Rabindra Rana	Rashtriya Janata Dal
2005	Amit Rana	Rashtriya Janata Dal
2005	Gopal Mandal	Janata Dal (United)
2010	Gopal Mandal	Janata Dal (United)
2015	Gopal Mandal	Janata Dal (United)
2020	Gopal Mandal	Janata Dal (United)
2025	Shailesh Mandal	Janata Dal (United)

== Election results ==
=== 2025 ===
Bihar Legislative Assembly Election, 2025: Gopalpur
Party	Candidate	Votes	%	±%
JD(U)	Shailesh Kumar alias Bulo Mandal	108,630	56.75	▲10.36
VIP	Premsagar alias Dablu Yadav	50,495	26.38	
Independent	Narendra Kumar Niraj	12,686	6.63	
JSP	Manakeshwar alias Mantu Singh	4,701	2.46	
Independent	Sanjiv Kumar Yadav Alias Moti Yadav	4,472	2.34	
NOTA	None of the above	4,782	2.5	▲0.11
Majority		58,135	30.37	▲15.35
Turnout		191,402	69.1	▲8.89
JD(U) hold		Swing		

=== 2020 ===
2020 Bihar Legislative Assembly election: Gopalpur
Party	Candidate	Votes	%	±%
JD(U)	Gopal Mandal	75,533	46.39	▲5.04
RJD	Shailesh Kumar	51,072	31.37	
LJP	Sures Bhagat	23,406	14.38	
Rashtriya Jan Jan Party	Sanjeev Kumar Singh	4,002	2.46	
NOTA	None of the above	3,888	2.39	▼1.24
Majority		24,461	15.02	▲11.3
Turnout		162,823	60.21	▲6.38
JD(U) hold		Swing		

=== 2015 ===
Bihar Assembly election, 2015: Gopalpur
Party	Candidate	Votes	%	±%
JD(U)	Gopal Mandal	57,403	41.35	
BJP	Anil Kumar Yadav	52,234	37.63	
Independent	Sures Bhagat	6,410	4.62	
CPI	Brahmdeo Yadav	4,462	3.21	
Independent	Amit Rana	3,186	2.3	
NCP	Amarenda Singh Nishad	2,807	2.02	
Independent	Sunil Kumar	2,239	1.61	
Independent	Md. Mohiuddin	1,867	1.35	
NOTA	None of the above	5,042	3.63	
Majority		5,169	3.72	
Turnout		138,807	53.83	

=== 2010 ===
Bihar assembly elections, 2010: Gopalpur
Party	Candidate	Votes	%	±%
JD(U)	Gopal Mandal	53876	47.00	
RJD	Amit Rana	28816	25.14	
