= Bhagalpur Lok Sabha constituency =

Lok Sabha constituency in Bihar

Coordinates: 25.2°N 87.0°E

Bhagalpur
- Lok Sabha constituency

Constituency details
- Country: India
- Region: East India
- State: Bihar
- Assembly constituencies: Bihpur; Gopalpur; Pirpainti; Kahalgaon; Bhagalpur; Nathnagar
- Established: 1951

Member of Parliament
- 18th Lok Sabha
- Incumbent Ajay Kumar Mandal
- Party: JD(U)
- Alliance: NDA
- Elected year: 2019
- Preceded by: Shailesh Kumar Mandal

Bhagalpur (Lok Sabha constituency) is one of the 40 Lok Sabha (parliamentary) constituencies in Bhagalpur in Bihar state in eastern India.

== Vidhan Sabha segments ==
Presently, Bhagalpur Lok Sabha constituency comprises the following six Vidhan Sabha (legislative assembly) segments:

#	Name	District	Member	Party	2024 lead
152	Bihpur	Bhagalpur	Kumar Shailendra	BJP	JD(U)
153	Gopalpur	Bhagalpur	Shailesh Kumar Mandal	JD(U)	JD(U)
154	Pirpainti	Bhagalpur	Murari Pasawan	BJP	JD(U)
155	Kahalgaon	Bhagalpur	Shubhanand Mukesh	JD(U)	JD(U)
156	Bhagalpur	Bhagalpur	Rohit Pandey	BJP	INC
158	Nathnagar	Bhagalpur	Mithun Kumar Yadav	LJP(RV)	INC

== Members of Lok Sabha ==
The following is the list of the Members of Parliament elected from this Lok Sabha constituency

Year	Name	Party
1952	Anoop Lal Mehta	Indian National Congress
1952	Kirai Mushahar	Socialist Party
1952^	J. B. Kripalani	Praja Socialist Party
1952^	Kirai Mushahar	Praja Socialist Party
1957	Banarsi Prasad Jhunjhunwala	Indian National Congress
1962	Bhagwat Jha Azad	Indian National Congress
1967	Bhagwat Jha Azad	Indian National Congress
1971	Bhagwat Jha Azad	Indian National Congress
1977	Ramjee Singh	Janata Party
1980	Bhagwat Jha Azad	Indian National Congress
1984	Bhagwat Jha Azad	Indian National Congress
1989	Chunchun Prasad Yadav	Janata Dal
1991	Chunchun Prasad Yadav	Janata Dal
1996	Chunchun Prasad Yadav	Janata Dal
1998	Prabhas Chandra Tiwari	Bharatiya Janata Party
1999	Subodh Ray	Communist Party of India (Marxist)
2004	Sushil Kumar Modi	Bharatiya Janata Party
2006^	Syed Shahnawaz Hussain	Bharatiya Janata Party
2009	Syed Shahnawaz Hussain	Bharatiya Janata Party
2014	Shailesh Kumar Mandal	Rashtriya Janata Dal
2019	Ajay Kumar Mandal	Janata Dal (United)
2024	Ajay Kumar Mandal	Janata Dal (United)

^ by-poll

== Election results ==
=== 2024 ===
2024 Indian general elections: Bhagalpur
Party	Candidate	Votes	%	±%
JD(U)	Ajay Kumar Mandal	536,031	50.38	
INC	Ajeet Sharma	4,31,163	40.52	
NOTA	None of the above	31,803	2.99	
Majority		1,04,868	9.86	
Turnout		10,65,031	53.57	
JD(U) hold		Swing		

=== 2019 ===
2019 Indian general elections: Bhagalpur
Party	Candidate	Votes	%	±%
JD(U)	Ajay Kumar Mandal	618,254	59.30	
RJD	Shailesh Kumar (Bulo Mandal)	3,40,624	32.67	
NOTA	None of the Above	31,567	3.03	
IND.	Nurullah	9,620	0.92	
BSP	Mohammad Ashiq Ibrahimi	9,572	0.92	
Majority		2,77,630	26.63	
Turnout		10,43,182	57.20	−0.60
JD(U) gain from RJD		Swing		

=== 2014 election ===
2014 Indian general elections: Bhagalpur
Party	Candidate	Votes	%	±%
RJD	Shailesh Kumar (Bulo Mandal)	3,67,623	37.74	
BJP	Syed Shahnawaz Hussain	3,58,138	36.76	
JD(U)	Abu Qaiser	1,32,256	13.58	
IND	Ramjee Mandal	18,937	1.94	
IND	Indradeo Kumar Singh	12,710	1.30	
NOTA	None of the Above	11,875	1.22	
Majority		9,485	0.98	
Turnout		9,74,016	57.80	
RJD gain from BJP		Swing		

=== 1957 election ===
- Banarshi Prasad Jhunjhunwala (INC) : 93,315 votes
- Chhabinath Singh (CPI) : 43,876

== See also ==
- Bhagalpur district
- List of constituencies of the Lok Sabha
