= Nathnagar, Bihar =

Town in India

Nathnagar
- Town in Bhagalpur district
- Location in Bihar, India Location in India
- Coordinates: 25.21217°N 86.9832°E
- Country: India
- State: Bihar
- Region: Anga
- District: Bhagalpur
- Urban Agglomeration: Bhagalpur Urban Agglomeration

Government
  - Type: census town

Population (2023)
  - Total: 7,600

Language
  - Official: Hindi
  - Additional official: Urdu
  - Regional: Angika
- Time zone: UTC+5:30 (IST)
- Vehicle registration: BR-10
- Lok Sabha constituency: Bhagalpur
- Vidhan Sabha constituency: Nathnagar

Nathnagar is a town in Bhagalpur district in the Anga region of Bihar, India. It is a census town of Bhagalpur district and the headquarters of Nathnagar C.D block. Back in the early vedic period Nathnagar's Champanagar was the capital of the Anga Mahajanpada.
