= Ali Ashraf Siddiqui =

Indian politician

Member of the Bihar Legislative Assembly
- Incumbent
- Assumed office 2020
- Preceded by: Ajay Kumar Mandal
- Constituency: Nathnagar

Personal details
- Party: Rashtriya Janata Dal
- Parent: Late Badrul Hoda Siddiqui (father)
- Profession: Cultivation

Ali Ashraf Siddiqui is an Indian politician from Bihar who is a Member of the Bihar Legislative Assembly. Siddiqui won the election of Nathnagar constituency on the Rashtriya Janata Dal ticket in the 2020 Bihar Legislative Assembly election.
