= Subodh Roy (politician) =

Indian politician

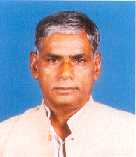

Member of Lok Sabha
- In office 10 October 1999 – 6 February 2004
- Preceded by: Prabhas Chandra Tiwari
- Succeeded by: Sushil Kumar Modi
- Constituency: Bhagalpur

Member of the Bihar Legislative Assembly
- In office 2010–2020
- Preceded by: Sudhanshu Shekhar Bhaskar
- Succeeded by: Lalit Narayan Mandal
- Constituency: Sultanganj

Personal details
- Born: July 18, 1942 (age 83) Bhagalpur district
- Party: Janata Dal (United)
- Other political affiliations: Communist Party of India (Marxist)
- Parent: Dheernath Ray (father)
- Education: Graduate; Tilka Manjhi Bhagalpur University

Subodh Roy is an Indian politician who served as Member of 13th Lok Sabha from Bhagalpur Lok Sabha constituency and Member of 14th and 15th Bihar Legislative Assembly from Sultanganj Assembly constituency. In the 1998 Indian general election, he received 47.94% or 321,159 votes.

== Personal life ==
He was born on 18 July 1942 in Bhagalpur district.
