= Gorelal Manishi =

Indian activist and writer (1944–2012)

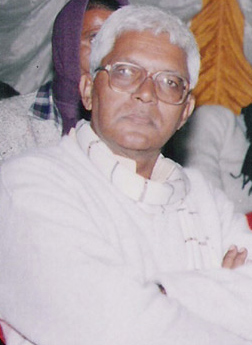
- Born: 1 January 1944; Khanpur (Mal), Bhagalpur, Bihar, India
- Died: 30 September 2012 (aged 68)

Gorelal Manishi (Hindi: गोरे लाल मनीषी) (1 January 1944 – 30 September 2012) was an Indian social activist, Angika language writer, former Bihar Government Engineering Services Officer and former president of Bihar Engineering Services Association. He was also the board member of Kosi Bund Erosion Judicial Enquiry Commission as constituted by the Govt. of Bihar. He was a civil engineering graduate and also he had earned bachelor's degree in Law (LLB) while he was in engineering services.

== Early years ==
Gorelal Manishi was born to a medium class farmer family to Narayan Singh and Mundri Devi in a small village Khanpur (Mal), Bhagalpur, Bihar, India. The ancestors of Manishi emigrated from Nearer village Bhikhanpur to Khanpur (Mal). Manishi lost his father at very early age to be taken care of his childhood and later period of his life by his mother. His mother Mundri Devi was not formally literate but was very well skilled in agricultural and farming management. His mother helped him throughout in moulding his career. He enrolled for primary school in Inglish Khanpur and attended high school in Karahraiya village. He earned his early college degree from TNB, Bhagalpur and later studied civil engineering at Bhagalpur College of Engineering, Bhagalpur.

== Engineering career ==
Upon graduation, Manishi took up jobs at various posts at the Water Resource Department of govt of Bihar for 29 years. Thereafter he had taken retirement from the govt services voluntarily to concentrate and devote more time to anti-corruption activities. He was known for his honesty, sincerity, time management and dedication. The North Koel River Valley Project, Palamu, Jharkhand, Western Koshi canal Project, Kunauli, Bihar, Subernrekha River Multipurpose Project, Jamshedpur, Jharkhand were among those important projects where he worked during his tenure.

== Social services career ==
Manishi actively worked in spreading and generating awareness among people for issues of corruptions and right to information act. He also spread scientific knowledge and a scientific world vision amongst the people. He also worked to spread awareness on topics of Indian national interest. He was active members of various social organisation, important among them were, Bharat Gyan Vigyan Samiti, Lok Adhikar Sangathan, Azadi Bachao Andolan, Right to Information Campaign.

== Anti-corruption movement/campaign ==
As an engineer, Manishi was troubled by the rampant corruption in government departments at almost all the levels. In 2004, he had quit by offering voluntarily retirement from work to focus on RTI campaign. People recognize him for activating the RTI movement at the grassroots, and empowering Bihar's poor citizens to fight corruption. Along with other social activists like Aruna Roy, Arvind Kejriwal, Manish Sisodia and others Manishi came to be recognised as an important contributor to the campaign for a state and national-level Right to Information Act (enacted in 2005).

== Awards and recognition ==
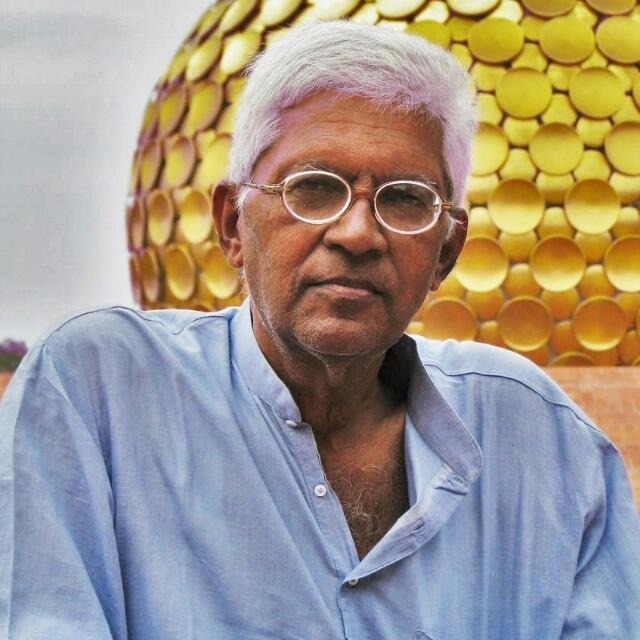
Gore Lal Manishi at Auroville, Puducherry, India in 2009

Gore lal Manishi was appointed as a board member of Kosi Bund Erosion Judicial Enquiry Commission as constituted by the Govt. of Bihar. He was feted with Life Member of Indian Geotechnical Society, New Delhi, Life Member of Institution of Engineers, Kolkata, Members of Indian Road Congress and various other statutory engineering bodies. He was president of the Bihar Engineering Service Association.

After his death, he was awarded with the highest honour of Bihar Engineering Service Association, the Abhiyanta Ratna, in September 2014.

Manishi died of prostate cancer on 30 September 2012 in Navi Mumbai, Maharashtra, India.
