= Outstanding Parliamentarian Award =

Award given by the Indian Parliamentary Group

The Outstanding Parliamentarian Award is an award given by the Indian Parliamentary Group to an outstanding sitting Member of the Indian Parliament for overall contribution in the Indian Parliament. It was instituted in 1995 by Shivraj Patil, who was the Speaker of Lok Sabha from 1991 to 1996.

== Recipients ==
=== Pandit Govind Ballabh Pant Award for Best Parliamentarian ===
Year	Laureates	Party
1992	Indrajit Gupta	CPI
1994	Atal Bihari Vajpayee	Bharatiya Janata Party (BJP)

=== List of Outstanding Parliamentarian Award Winners ===
Year	Laureates	Party
1995	Chandra Shekhar	SJP(R)
1996	Somnath Chatterjee	CPI(M)
1997	Pranab Mukherjee	INC
1998	Jaipal Reddy	JD
1999	Lal Krishna Advani	BJP
2000	Arjun Singh	INC
2001	Jaswant Singh	BJP
2002	Manmohan Singh	INC
2003	Sharad Pawar	NCP
2004	Sushma Swaraj	BJP
2005	P. Chidambaram	INC
2006	Mani Shankar Aiyar	INC
2007	Priyaranjan Das Munshi	INC
2008	Mohan Singh	SP
2009	Murli Manohar Joshi	BJP
2010	Arun Jaitley	BJP
2011	Karan Singh	INC
2012	Sharad Yadav	JD(U)
2013	Najma Heptulla	BJP
2014	Hukmdev Narayan Yadav	BJP
2015	Ghulam Nabi Azad	INC
2016	Dinesh Trivedi	AITC
2017	Bhartruhari Mahtab	BJD

== Criticism ==
It has been observed that the award has been awarded in a pattern to senior leaders of major political parties. Questions have been raised on the need, seriousness and authenticity of the exercise to present the ‘Outstanding Parliamentarian Award’.
