= Lakshmikant Mandal =

Indian politician

MLA of Nathnagar
- In office 24 October 2019 – 10 November 2020
- Preceded by: Ajay Kumar Mandal

Personal details
- Party: Janata Dal (United)

Lakshmikant Mandal is an Indian politician in Janata Dal (United). He was elected as a member of the Bihar Legislative Assembly from Nathnagar on 24 October 2019.
