= Maharani Chakravorty =

Indian biologist

- Born: 1937; Bhagalpur, Bihar
- Died: 2015 (aged 77–78); Kolkata, India
- Education: Presidency College (BSc); Rajabazar Science College (MSc); Bose Institute (PhD)
- Spouse: Debi Prosad Burma
- Awards: Y. S. Narayan Rao Award, J.C. Sengupta Memorial Award
- Scientific career
- Fields: Genetic engineering, molecular biology

Maharani Chakravorty (1937–2015) was an Indian molecular biologist. She organized the first laboratory course on recombinant DNA techniques in Asia and Far East in 1981.

== Early life ==
Chakravorty was born in 1937 in Kolkata. She cultivated an interest in science and mathematics due to the influence of her maternal grandfather. She matriculated in 1950, graduated with a B.Sc. from Presidency College, Kolkata, obtained her M.Sc. from the prestigious Rajabazar Science College, University of Calcutta and a PhD from the Bose Institute, Kolkata.

== Career and research ==
Chakravorty did her PhD on microbial protein synthesis from Bose Institute, Kolkata under the mentorship of Dr. Debi Prosad Burma. As a part of her thesis work, she demonstrated cell free protein synthesis with a particulate preparation from Azotobacter vinelandii. She did her post-doctoral training in enzyme chemistry in the laboratory of B. L. Horecker at the New York University school of medicine. Her specialized training in 'bacterial genetics and virology' was completed at Cold Spring Harbor Laboratory, Long Island, U.S.A.

From 1968 to 1969, she worked in the laboratory of Prof. Myron Levine in the Department of Human Genetics, Ann Arbor, Michigan, USA. She established that the membrane complex of Salmonella typhimurium having a sedimentation constant of 1000S, is the site of not only DNA synthesis but also of RNA synthesis.

After the research, she returned to India and joined the Bose Institute. She undertook research on the regulations of metabolism in unicellular organisms. Later, she joined the Department of Biochemistry at Banaras Hindu University. At BHU, she undertook research for understanding the biochemical differences between cells undergoing lysogeny and those undergoing lysis. She inferred that following viral infection protein synthesis is controlled at the level of translation. She isolated an RNase I deficient mutant of S. typhimurium during the course of her research.

== Death ==
Chakravorty died in 2015. She was married to fellow scientist Debi Prosad Burma and is survived by two children.

== Awards and honours ==
- Certificate of Merit of the Institute of Medical Sciences, BHU (1975–76)
- Best Research Award of the Institute of Medical Sciences, BHU (1979)
- Kshanika Oration Award (1979) by the ICMR
- Y.S Narayan Rao Award (1981) by the ICMR
- Hari Om Ashram Alembic Research Award (1981) by the Medical Council of India
- J.C Sengupta Memorial Award
- Professor Darshan Ranganathan Memorial Award (2007) of INSA.
