= Prabhas Chandra Tiwari =

Indian politician

Member of Parliament, Lok Sabha
- In office 1998–1999
- Preceded by: Chunchun Prasad Yadav
- Succeeded by: Subodh Roy
- Constituency: Bhagalpur

Personal details
- Born: 17 February 1941; Kaneri, Bhagalpur district, Bihar
- Political party: Bharatiya Janata Party
- Spouse: Sarojini Naidu Tiwari
- Children: 3 sons, 4 daughters
- Parent: Bulaki Lal Tiwari (father)
- Education: M.A. (Political science); M.A. (Economics); Bachelor of Laws
- Alma mater: Patna University
- Profession: Advocate, Politician

Prabhas Chandra Tiwari was an Indian politician from Bihar who represented Bhagalpur in the Lok Sabha from 1998 to 1999. However he lost the subsequent election to Subodhy Roy of CPI(M).
