= Kaharpur =

- village
- Location within Bihar Location within India
- Coordinates: 25°25′58.6″N 86°57′50.8″E
- Country: India
- State: Bihar
- District: Bhagalpur
- Block: Bihpur

Population (2011)
  - Total: 1,404
- Time zone: UTC+5:30 (IST)
- Postal code: 853201
- PIN Code: 853201
- ISO 3166 code: IN-BR

Kaharpur is a village located in the Bihpur block of Bhagalpur district in Bihar, India. It is situated 5 km away from sub-district headquarter Bihpur and 37 km away from district headquarter Bhagalpur. It comes under Hario Panchayat.

== Geography and population ==
The total geographical area of village is 878 hectares. Kaharpur has a total population of 1,404 people, out of which male population is 768 while female population is 636. Literacy rate of Kaharpur village is 38.46% out of which 41.67% males and 34.59% females are literate. There are about 259 houses in Kaharpur.

== Language ==
The primary language spoken in the village is Angika. Most of the people understand and can speak Hindi as well.

== Threat to the village's existence ==
Dozens of houses have been submerged in Kosi due continuous soil erosion by waves of Kosi river. The primary school and civil hospital have also been submerged in Kosi.
