= Sultanganj Assembly constituency =

- Constituency No. 157 for the Bihar Legislative Assembly

Constituency details
- Country: India
- Region: East India
- State: Bihar
- District: Bhagalpur
- Established: 1951
- Total electors: 319,989
- Reservation: None

Member of Legislative Assembly
- 18th Bihar Legislative Assembly
- Incumbent Lalit Narayan Mandal
- Party: JD(U)
- Alliance: NDA
- Elected year: 2025

Sultanganj Assembly constituency is one of 243 constituencies of legislative assembly of Bihar. It is a part of Banka Lok Sabha constituency along with other assembly constituencies viz. Amarpur, Dhoraiya, Banka, Katoria and Belhar.

== Overview ==
Sultanganj comprises CD Blocks Sultanganj & Shahkund.

== Members of the Legislative Assembly ==
Year	Name	Party
1952	Rash Bihari Lal	Indian National Congress
1957	Sarswati Devi	Indian National Congress
1962	Deviprasad Mahto	Indian National Congress
1967	Banarsi Prasad Sharma	Praja Socialist Party
1969	Ram Raksha Prasad Yadav	Indian National Congress
1972	Ram Raksha Prasad Yadav	Indian National Congress
1977	Jageshwar Mandal	Janata Party
1980	Nand Kumar Manjhi	Indian National Congress
1985	Umesh Chandras Das	Indian National Congress
1990	Fanindra Choudhary	Janata Dal
1995	Fanindra Choudhary	Janata Dal
2000	Ganesh Paswan	Samata Party
2005	Sudhanshu Shekhar Bhaskar	Janata Dal (United)
2005	Sudhanshu Shekhar Bhaskar	Janata Dal (United)
2010	Subodh Roy	Janata Dal (United)
2015	Subodh Roy	Janata Dal (United)
2020	Lalit Narayan Mandal	Janata Dal (United)
2025	Lalit Narayan Mandal	Janata Dal (United)

== Election results ==
=== 2025 ===
2025 Bihar Legislative Assembly election: Sultanganj
Party	Candidate	Votes	%	±%
JD(U)	Lalit Narayan Mandal	108,712	51.81	+9.23
RJD	Chandan Kumar Sinha	77,576	36.97	
JSP	Rakesh Kumar	4,402	2.1	
Independent	Ajit Kumar	4,286	2.04	
INC	Lalan Kumar	2,754	1.31	−34.51
NOTA	None of the above	4,108	1.96	−0.8
Majority		31,136	14.84	+8.08
Turnout		209,814	65.57	+13.47
JD(U) hold		Swing		

=== 2020 ===
2020 Bihar Legislative Assembly election: Sultanganj
Party	Candidate	Votes	%	±%
JD(U)	Lalit Narayan Mandal	72,823	42.58	+1.64
INC	Lalan Kumar	61,258	35.82	
LJP	Nilam Devi	10,222	5.98	
RLSP	Himanshu Prasad	5,713	3.34	−28.53
Bhartiya Sablog Party	Ravi Suman Kumar @ Arun Mandal	4,692	2.74	
Independent	Ramanand Paswan	2,860	1.67	
Independent	Rajan Kumar	2,389	1.4	
NOTA	None of the above	4,719	2.76	−2.52
Majority		11,565	6.76	−2.31
Turnout		171,037	52.1	+2.05
JD(U) hold				

=== 2015 ===
Bihar Assembly election, 2015: Sultanganj
Party	Candidate	Votes	%	±%
JD(U)	Subodh Roy	63,345	40.94	
RLSP	Himanshu Prasad	49,312	31.87	
Independent	Lalan Kumar	14,073	9.1	
Independent	Rakesh Kumar Sah	4,041	2.61	
JAP(L)	Chakrapani Himanshu	3,186	2.06	
CPI	Dr. Dinesh Chandra Diwakar	2,732	1.77	
BSP	Gobind Bhaiya	2,140	1.38	
SP	Amar Jeet Kumar Singh	1,914	1.24	
Independent	Kiran Mishra	1,884	1.22	
Independent	Arun Kumar Singh	1,843	1.19	
NOTA	None of the above	8,165	5.28	
Majority		14,033	9.07	
Turnout		154,726	50.05	
JD(U) hold				

=== 2010 ===
Bihar assembly elections, 2010: Sultanganj
Party	Candidate	Votes	%	±%
JD(U)	Subodh Rai	34652	28.05	
RJD	Ramavatar Mandal	29807	24.12	
JD(U) hold				
