= Rohit Pandey =

Indian politician

Member of the Bihar Legislative Assembly
- Incumbent
- Assumed office 14 November 2025
- Preceded by: Ajit Sharma
- Constituency: Bhagalpur

Personal details
- Party: Bharatiya Janata Party
- Profession: Politician

Rohit Pandey is an Indian politician from Bihar. He is elected as a Member of Legislative Assembly in 2025 Bihar Legislative Assembly election from Bhagalpur constituency.

== Political career ==
Rohit Pandey won from Bhagalpur constituency representing Bharatiya Janata Party in the 2025 Bihar Legislative Assembly election. He polled 1,00,519 votes and defeated his nearest rival, Ajit Sharma of Indian National Congress, by a margin of 13,474 votes.
