= Bhagalpur sari =

Silk sari made in Bhagalpur, India

Bhagalpur sari is a silk sari made in Bhagalpur, India. More than a century old, Tussar silk weaving industry in Bhagalpur has about 30,000 handloom weavers working on some 25,000 handlooms. The total value of annual trade is around Rs. 100 crores (one billion), about half of which comes from exports. It has the GI tag.

== History ==
The history of making Bhagalpuri silk sarees started 200 years by highly skilled craftsmen. The unique dyeing technique of these Bhagalpuri silk sarees sets them apart from the art silk sarees. Nowadays, instead of vegetable dyes, acid dyes are used because they are suitable for silk and easily available on the market.

== See also ==
- Ilkal saree
- Mysore silk
- Navalgund Durries
