= National Career Service (India) =

Publicly-funded careers service

The National Career Service (NCS) is a career service in India operated by the Indian Government's Ministry of Labour and Employment. It was launched by Prime Minister Narendra Modi on 20 July 2015, aimed at replacing the existing nationwide system of Employment Exchanges with IT-enabled Career Centers. In 2021, the project was allocated a budget of ₹1,000 crore (US$120 million). It also publishes data on vacancies and number of employers registered.

There are over 1,000 employment exchanges across India, operated by state governments. The aim of the NCS is to transform these exchanges into IT-enabled career centers providing a digital platform for stakeholders in the employment market. The Career Centres are thus a modified version of Employment Exchanges, intended to address a wider range of career-related needs of youth and students.
