= Ajit Sharma =

Business-man turned politician from Bihar, India

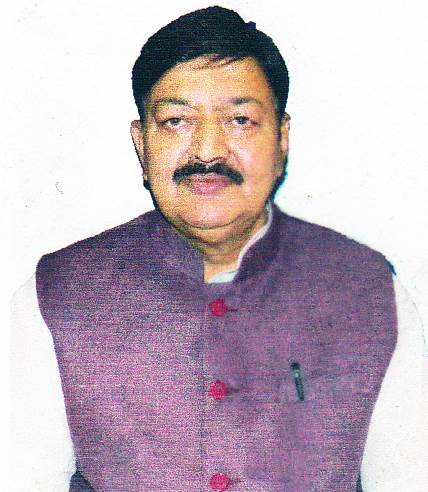

Member of the Bihar Legislative Assembly
- In office 2014–2025
- Preceded by: Ashwini Kumar Choubey
- Succeeded by: Rohit Pandey
- Constituency: Bhagalpur

Personal details
- Born: 2 February 1954 (age 72) Bhagalpur, Bihar, India
- Party: INC
- Children: Neha Sharma (daughter); Aisha Sharma (daughter)
- Occupation: Politics

Ajit Sharma is an Indian politician belonging to Indian National Congress. He is a former member of the Bihar Legislative Assembly. He won from Bhagalpur (Vidhan Sabha constituency) in 2014, 2015 and 2020 Bihar Legislative Assembly election.

== Personal life ==
His daughters Neha Sharma and Aisha Sharma are Bollywood actresses.
