= Lalit Narayan Mandal =

Indian politician

Lalit Narayan Mandal is an Indian politician from Bihar and a Member of the Bihar Legislative Assembly. Mandal won the Sultanganj Assembly constituency on the JD(U) ticket in the 2020 Bihar Legislative Assembly election.
