= B. J. Choubey =

Indian academician

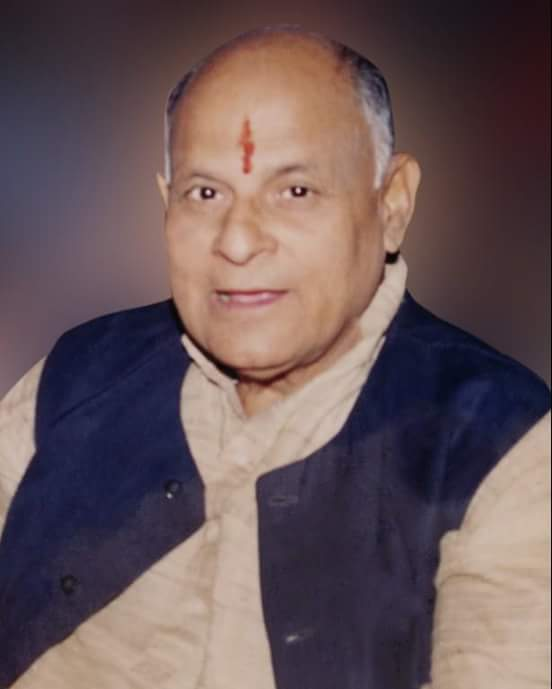
Dr (Prof)B J Choubey

Dr B. J. Choubey (15 September 1934 – 19 February 2008) was a scholar of Zoology and University professor at Tilka Manjhi Bhagalpur University. He is best known for his contribution in the field of endocrine research at University of Bhagalpur. He was a research student under the guidance of Dr. P. Thapliyal] at Banaras Hindu University.His scholarly publications have influenced many researchers in this field.

== Publications ==
- B J Choubey (August 1977). "Effect of thyroidectomy on sex & accessory sex organs in a common Indian garden lizard Calotes versicolor (Daud)". Indian Journal of Experimental Biology. 15 (8): 598–600. PMID 606665.
- B J Choubey; J P Thapliyal (December 1966). "Agonadal garden lizard: Calotes versicolor". Die Naturwissenschaften. 53 (23): 618. Bibcode:1966NW.....53..618C. doi:10.1007/BF00632289. PMID 5990842. S2CID 19701017.
- B J Choubey; J S Munshi; B N Pandey; P K Pandey; J Ojha (September 1976). "Oxygen uptake capacity in relation to respiratory surface area of an air-breathing siluroid fish Saccobranchus (=Heteropneustes) fossilis (Bloch)". Indian Journal of Experimental Biology. 14 (5): 557–60. PMID 1024976.
- B J Choubey; P K Pandey; A Moitra; J S Datta Munshi (1928). "Role of L-thyroxine, hydrocortisone and progesterone in regulation of blood volume in a fresh-water air-breathing fish, Clarias batrachus (Linn.)". Folia Haematologica. 105 (5). Leipzig, Germany: 656–64. PMID 85575.
- B J Choubey; B N Pandey; J S Datta Munshi; P K Pandey (1975). "Effect of environmental factors on the activity of thyroid gland in an air breathing siluroid fish Heteropneustes fossilis Bloch". Zeitschrift für mikroskopisch-anatomische Forschung. 89 (5): 859–69. PMID 1234391.
- B J Choubey, Fasihuddin, M. and J S Datta Munshi. "Study of oxygen consumption in relation to body size in a fresh water siluroid fish Mystus vittatus Bloch". Indian J. Zoot. 13: 101–109.
- B J Choubey; N K Singh (1928). "Some aspects of haematology of an Indian grass snake Natrix stolata in relation to sex and size". Folia Haematologica. 104 (1). Leipzig, Germany: 75–84. PMID 69577.
- B J Choubey; A K Sinha (1981). "Seasonal changes in the thyroid gland of Indian spiny tailed, sand lizard, Uromastix hardwickii (Gray) male". Zeitschrift für mikroskopisch-anatomische Forschung. 95 (1): 72–80. PMID 7234073.
- B J Choubey; B N Pandey; P K Pandey; J S Datta Munshi (1928). "Studies on blood components of an air-breathing siluroid fish, Heteropneustes fossilis (Bloch) in relation to body weight". Folia Haematologica. 103 (1). Leipzig, Germany: 101–16. PMID 58809.
