= Ramjee Singh =

Indian academic, philosopher, and politician

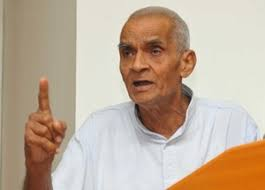
Image of Dr Ramjee Singh

Ramjee Singh (born 1927, India) is a former Member of Parliament and vice-chancellor of Jain Vishva Bharati University. He is an eminent Gandhian and is the author of a number of books on him. He was also the director of Gandhian Institute of Studies, Varanasi, India. In January 2020 he was awarded the fourth highest civilian award in the country: The Padma Shri for Social Work. His life has been a blend of being a Gandhian academician as well as an activist. Singh has declared Mahatma Gandhi as the Bodhisattva of the 20th century.

== Education and achievements ==
Towards his academic achievements, he has earned three doctorate degrees, a PhD in Jainism, a D.Litt. in Hindu thought and another D.Litt. in Political Science in Gandhism and was awarded emeritus fellowship. He is a prolific writer and has authored and edited about 50 books, mostly on Gandhism and Indian philosophy and culture both in English and Hindi. He was also vice-chancellor of the Jain University, and a panel speaker at the International Philosophical Congress (Brighton) and Parliament of the World's Religions (Chicago, 1993), and Cape Town, 2001. He was secretary and president of All India Philosophical Association for about 12 years and is currently the vice-president of Afro-Asian Philosophical Association.

He has served as the secretary of Akhil Bharatiya Darshan Parishad for 9 years and its chairman for 6 years and the secretary of Afro Asian Philosophy Association (for Asia) since 1985. He was also associated with the Royal Institute of Philosophy and Psychology, Sydney, etc. He was invited to address the plenary session of World Congress of Philosophy at Brighton, United Kingdom, which the British newspapers and the BBC acclaimed very highly. He was the founder and head of the Department of Gandhian Thought at Bhagalpur University, where he served as its chairman for 10 years. He has combined academics with social activism.

== Freedom movement and social activism ==
As a social activist he participated in freedom movement of India in 1942 under Gandhi's leadership and also suffered imprisonment for 21 months when the Indian government had suppressed all civil and political rights and imposed emergency in 1975–77. As a result, he was elected to the Parliament of India with a margin of 186,000 votes against his formidable rival, who was later Chief Minister of Bihar. He has also raised his voice against inhuman blinding of under-trial prisoners in jail before the Supreme Court of India and had moved a Public Interest Litigation in the High Court for the protection of the rights of the landless people. As a Gandhian peace activist he has organised about 70 youth peace camps and helped to set up departments of Gandhian Studies and peace research throughout the country from the time he was president of the Indian Society of Gandhian Studies. He still continues to be the president of the Indian Society of Gandhian Studies. He has taught philosophy and Gandhian thought for 50 years and he is still an emeritus fellow of the University Grants Commission.

== International representation ==
- Parliament of the World's Religions, Chicago (1993).
- World Philosophy Congress (Brighton, 1988), Moscow.
- World Philanthropy Conference, Toronto 1991.
- Member, East-West Philosophical Meet, Hawaii 1995.
- Has travelled and represented India in various meetings and seminars in UK, United States, France, Italy, USS.R, Japan, Thailand, S. Korea, Singapore, Pakistan, Sri Lanka, Kenya, South Africa, Egypt, the Netherlands, Nepal, Canada etc.

== Associations with educational, social and cultural bodies ==
- Hon. president, International society of social philosophy
- Vice-President, Afro-Asian Philosophical Association.
- Chancellor, Vikramshila Hindi Vidyapeeth, Bhagalpur.
- Convener, National Committee for Shanti-Sena.
- Emeritus professor of Gandhian thought (University Grants Commission).
- Ex- member, Indian Council of Philosophical Research.
- Ex- member, Royal Institute of Philosophy, London.
- Ex-member, Mind Association, Oxford.
- Life-member, Indian Philosophical Congress.
- Hon. Member, World Jain Mission.
- Life Member, Indian Parliamentary Group, Delhi.
- Member, National Board of Adult Education, 1977–79.
- Member, University Grants Commission Committee on Regional Languages, 1978–79.
- member, University Grants Commission Committee on Evaluation of N.A.E.P., 1979.
- Member of Amnesty International, 1977–81
- Member, Parliamentary Committee on Library, 1977–79
- Member, University Grants Commission Committee on Gandhian Centenary celebration.
- President, Indian Society of Gandhian Thought (1989–94)
- Member, Advisory Council of Harijan Sevak Sangh
- Patron, Shree Rash Bihari Mission
- Member, Standing Committee, Bharat Navjagran Yojna

== Books ==
- Jainism in the new millennium Commonwealth publication (2010).
- Mahatma Gandhi- Man of the millennium ( Commonwealth Publication (2010).
- Gandhi aur gandhi vichar ka saurya mandal, Arjun Publication, Delhi, 2010.
- Hind Swaraj and Satyagraha (Commonwealth Publication, New delhi, 2010.
- राष्ट्रीय धर्म और राजनीति (Arjun Publication, 2010).
- भारतीय दर्शनशात्र और धर्म ((Arjun Publication, 2010).
- Gandhi dristi (Arjun Publication, 2010).
- Dimensions of Indian thought and culture, Manak (1998).
- Gandhi and the modern world, Classical Pub. Co (1988).
- Gandhi and the new millennium, Commonwealth (2000).
- The Gandhian vision, Manak Publications; 1st edition (1998).
- Jaina perspective in philosophy and religion (Parsvanatha sodhapitha granthamala), Pujya Sohanalal Smaraka Parsvanatha Sodhapitha; 1st edition (1993).
- JP 100 Years; Text and Context, Commonwealth Publishers (2004).
- The relevance of Gandhian thought, Classical Pub. Co (1983).
- The Jaina concept of omniscience, L.D. Institute of Indology (1974).
- The concept of Omniscience in ancient Hindu thought, Oriental Publishers & Distributors (1979).
- Gandhi and the twenty-first century, Peace Publishers (1993).
- Gandhian darshan mimansa (Hindi), Bihar Hindi Granth Academy, Patna, 1974.
- Samaj Darshan ka mool tatva (Hindi), Rajasthan Hindi Granth Academy, Patna 1979.
- Gandhi and the 31st Century, Peace Publication, Delhi 1993.
- Bhartiya darshan aur chintan (Hindi), Manak Publication, New Delhi, 1997.
- Gandhi Vichar (Hindi), Manak Publication, Delhi, 1995.
- Gandhian Vision, Manak Publication, New Delhi, 1997.
- Reflections of Jaina, Manak Publications, New Delhi, 2003.
- Peace: ideology and action, gis, 1997.
- Naya samaj aur Nayi Sanskriti, Commonwealth Publishers, New Delhi, 2002.

== Books edited ==
- Sarvodaya of Gandhi, Raj Hans Publications, New Delhi, 1984.
- World Perspective in Philosophy, Religion and Culture, Bharti Bhawan, Patna, 1960.
- Gandhi's relevance from modern times, Bhagalpur University, 1968.
- Sant-mat ki paramparaye (Hindi) 2009.
- Essential unity of all religions, Bhagalpur University, 1968.
- Relevance of satyagraha for modern times, Bhagalpur University, 1971.
- Gandhi's centenary number, T.N.B . college, Bhagalpur University, 1970.
- Vinoba-Satsang (Hindi), N.B. College, Bhagalpur University, 1968.
- Sa-Vidyana-Vimuktaye, GPF, Bhagalpur, 1968.
- Sarvodaya OF Gandhi, Rajhans Publications, Delhi, 1984.
- Gandhi jyoti, Quarterly journal of Gandhian Thought, (1986–92).
- Mehi janmashanti abhinandan granths, Bhagalpur, 1983.
- Satsang piyush, Munger, 1994.
- Sarsang Gandhi, Munger, 1995.
- Mahatma Gandhi:125 years, S.S. prakashan, Varanasi, 1996.
- Gandhi and the world order, Radiant Publication, Delhi, 1996.
- Gandhi and the future of humanity, Manak Publication, Delhi, 1997.
- Kasturba: bhartiya stree-shakti ki Pratika, GIS, 1997.
- Sradha and Samarpan, Varanasi, 1999.
- Manas Mangalam, Indrukh Manas Samiti, 2002.

== See also ==
- List of peace activists
- Bhagalpur University
- Sarva Seva Sangh
- Harijan Sevak Sangh
- Akhil Bhartiya Darshan Parishad
- Gandhi Peace Foundation
