= Bhagalpuri silk =

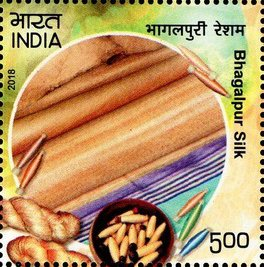
Stamp of India 2018 Traditional Handloom Textiles Bhagalpur Silk

Bhagalpuri silk or Tussar silk is a traditional style of silk saris. This material is used for making saris named as Bhagalpuri sari. Bhagalpur is also known as "silk city" of India. Bhagalpuri silk is made from cocoons of Antheraea paphia silkworms. This species, also known as Vanya silkworm, is native to India. These silkworms live in the wild forests, in trees belonging to Terminalia species. campanagar ( nathnagar ) is a place where Bhagalpuri silk is mainly processed. Besides sari, shawls, kurtis, and other garments are also made from Bhagalpuri silk.
