= Indian Parliamentary Group =

Body of Parliamentarians in India

The Indian Parliamentary Group is an autonomous body, membership of which is open to all current or former members of the Parliament of India. the Speaker of the Lok Sabha is its ex-officio President. It was founded in 1949, following a Motion adopted by the Constituent Assembly on 16 August 1948.

A Member of Parliament can become a life Member of the Group on payment of life subscription. On ceasing to be a Member of Parliament, a life member of the Group is designated as ‘Associate Life Member’. The management and control of the affairs of the Group are vested in the Executive Committee.

A link between the Indian parliament and its foreign counterparts, the group functions as the National Group of the Inter-Parliamentary Union (IPU), and the Main Branch of the Commonwealth Parliamentary Association (CPA) in India.

The Indian Parliamentary Group awards the Outstanding Parliamentarian Award.
