= Chunchun Prasad Yadav =

Indian politician

Member of Parliament, Lok Sabha
- In office 2 December 1989 – 4 December 1997
- Preceded by: Bhagwat Jha Azad
- Succeeded by: Prabhas Chandra Tiwari
- Constituency: Bhagalpur

Personal details
- Born: 11 March 1932 Baluachak, Bengal Presidency, British India
- Died: 24 February 2017 (aged 84) Bhagalpur, Bihar, India
- Party: Janata Dal
- Education: Marwari College, Bhagalpur

Chunchun Prasad Yadav (11 March 1932 – 24 February 2017) was an Indian Janata Dal politician from the state of Bihar. He served as a Member of Parliament, Lok Sabha representing Bhagalpur from 1989 to 1997.

== Personal life ==
Chunchun Prasad Yadav was born to Banwari Prasad Yadav on 11 March 1932 in Baluachak in Bhagalpur district, in the Bengal Presidency (present-day Bihar). He did B.A., B.T. (basic trained) from Marwari College, Bhagalpur and Teachers Training Centre, Fulwaria, Bhagalpur. He married Chintamani Devi, with whom he has three sons and three daughters.

== Politics ==
From 1969 to 1977 and from 1985 to 1989, Yadav was a member of the Bihar Legislative Assembly. From 1969 to 1971 and 1974 to 1977, he was a member of the Committee on Government Assurances. He was the Minister of State, Health, Bihar from March 1972 to April 1973. In the mid to late 1980s, he was a member of Zila Parishad and Panchayati Raj Committee, Bihar; Public Accounts Committee, Bihar Legislative Assembly and the General Secretary, Lok Dal, Bihar.

He was elected to the 9th Lok Sabha in 1989, reelected in the 10th Lok Sabha in 1991 and was a Consultative Committee, Ministry of Mines (1991–1996) and Member, Standing Committee on Defence (1993–96). Yadav was elected in the 11th Lok Sabha in 1996 for the third time in 1996.

Yadav died on 24 February 2017 in Bhagalpur after a spike in blood sugar levels.
