= Shailesh Kumar Mandal =

Indian politician

Minister of Energy Government of Bihar
- Incumbent
- Assumed office 07 May 2026
- Chief Minister: Samrat Choudhary
- Governor: Syed Ata Hasnain
- Preceded by: Bijendra Prasad Yadav

Member of Bihar Legislative Assembly
- Incumbent
- Assumed office 14 November 2025
- Preceded by: Gopal Mandal
- Constituency: Gopalpur

Member of the India Parliament
- In office 16 May 2014 – 23 May 2019
- Preceded by: Syed Shahnawaz Hussain
- Succeeded by: Ajay Kumar Mandal
- Constituency: Bhagalpur

Personal details
- Born: 6 May 1975 (age 51) Vill. Raghopur, Bhagalpur, Bihar
- Party: Janta Dal(United)
- Other political affiliations: RJD
- Spouse: Smt. Varsha Rani
- Children: 2
- As of 12 December, 2016

Shailesh Kumar Alias Bulo Mandal is an Indian politician. He has served in the Bihar Legislative Assembly and the Lok Sabha.

He was first elected to the Bihar Assembly in 2000 (13th Bihar Assembly) and re-elected twice in 2005 (14th Bihar Assembly and 15th Bihar Assembly). In 2014, he won the 2014 Indian general election for the Bhagalpur (Lok Sabha constituency) but lost in 2019 general election. In 2025, he was elected as a Member of the Legislative Assembly (MLA) from Gopalpur in the 2025 Bihar Legislative Assembly election. He is currently serving as the Energy Minister of Bihar.

== Personal life ==
Shailesh Kumar was born on 6 May 1975 in a Hindu Gangota Family in his native village Raghopur situated in Naugachia subdivision of Bhagalpur. He is son of Upendra Mandal and married with Varsha Rani having two children.

== Political career ==
Elected	Position	Constituency
2000	MLA in the 13th Bihar Assembly	Bihpur
2005 (Feb)	MLA in the 14th Bihar Assembly	Bihpur
2005 (Oct)	MLA in the 15th Bihar Assembly	Bihpur
2014	MP in the 16th Loksabha	Bhagalpur
2025	MLA in the 18th Bihar Assembly	Gopalpur
