= Syed Shahnawaz Hussain =

Indian politician

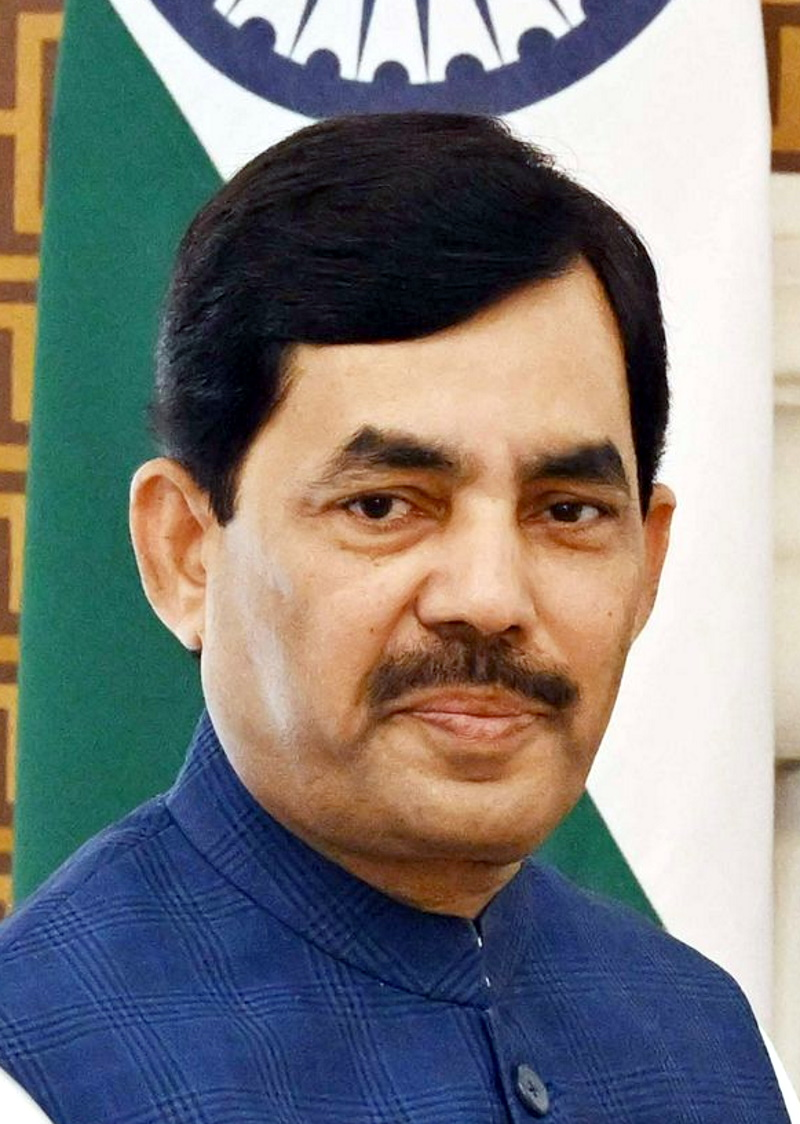
- Syed Shahnawaz Hussain

Cabinet Minister Government of Bihar
- In office 9 February 2021 – 9 August 2022
- Chief Minister: Nitish Kumar
- Ministry & Department's: Industries
- Preceded by: Renu Devi
- Succeeded by: Samir Kumar Mahaseth

Member of Bihar Legislative Council
- In office 21 January 2021 – 6 May 2024
- Preceded by: Sushil Kumar Modi

Union Cabinet Minister
- In office 1 September 2001 – 22 May 2004
- Prime Minister: Atal Bihari Vajpayee
- 24 May 2003 – 22 May 2004: Ministry of Textiles
- 1 September 2001 – 23 May 2003: Ministry of Civil Aviation

Union Minister of State
- In office 13 October 1999 – 1 September 2001
- Prime Minister: Atal Bihari Vajpayee
- 8 February 2001 – 1 September 2001: Ministry of Coal (Independent charge)
- 30 September 2000 – 8 February 2001: Ministry of Human Resource Development
- 13 October 1999 – 27 May 2000: Ministry of Food Processing Industries

Member of Parliament, Lok Sabha
- In office 11 May 2006 — 16 May 2014
- Preceded by: Sushil Kumar Modi
- Succeeded by: Shailesh Kumar Mandal
- Constituency: Bhagalpur, Bihar
- In office 6 October 1999 — 13 May 2004
- Preceded by: Mohammed Taslimuddin
- Succeeded by: Mohammed Taslimuddin
- Constituency: Kishanganj, Bihar

Personal details
- Born: 12 December 1968 (age 57) Supaul, Bihar, India
- Party: Bharatiya Janata Party
- Spouse: Renu Hussain (m. 1994)
- Children: 2 sons
- Occupation: Politician

Syed Shahnawaz Hussain (born 12 December 1968) is an Indian politician and senior leader of the Bharatiya Janata Party (BJP). He served as a National Spokesperson of the BJP and is a former Union Minister of the Government of India. Previously, he was a member of the Central Election Committee of the Bharatiya Janata Party.

Hussain was the Minister of Textiles and the Minister Civil Aviation in the Atal Bihari Vajpayee government. He has been the Minister of Industries of the Government of Bihar from 9 February 2021 to 9 August 2022.

== Personal life ==
Hussain was born to Syed Nasir Hussain and Nasima Khatoon in Supaul, Bihar. He has a Diploma in Engineering (Electronics) from B.S.S.E., Supaul and ITI, Pusa, Delhi. He married Renu Hussain on 12 December 1994, with whom he has two sons.

== Political career ==
Hussain was elected to the 13th Lok Sabha in 1999 from Kishanganj constituency. He was appointed a Minister of State in the Third Vajpayee ministry and held various portfolios such as food processing industries, youth affairs and sports and human resource development at different times. He was given independent charge of the Ministry of Coal in 2001 and was elevated to the rank of a Cabinet Minister with Civil Aviation portfolio in September 2001, thereby becoming the youngest Cabinet Minister ever in the Government of India until the election of Agatha Sangma. Later he held the Textiles portfolio as Cabinet Minister from 2003 to 2004. He is often referred to as 'The Original Youth leader'.

Though he lost the 2004 general elections, he re-entered the Lok Sabha in November 2006 in a by-election when he won the vacant seat of Bhagalpur constituency in Bihar.

In 2006, he was elected to 14th Lok Sabha in a by-election and served as Member of Standing Committee on External Affairs & Financial Committee on Estimates.

In 2009, he was re-elected to the 15th Lok Sabha again from Bhagalpur and served as Member of Committee on Personnel, Public Grievances, Law and Justice, Committee on Papers Laid on the Table and Committee on Privileges.

He contested the Lok Sabha election in 2014 from Bhagalpur again but lost with a small margin. He helped Bhagalpur to be named under Prime Minister Narendra Modi's Smart Cities Scheme. Due to his efforts, Dibrugarh Rajdhani Express got a halt at Naughachia Railway station.

On 21 January 2021, Hussain was elected unopposed to Bihar Legislative Council. On 9 February 2021, He was inducted as a cabinet minister in the Seventh Nitish Kumar ministry. He was the Minister of Industries of the Government of Bihar.
