= Bhagalpur Assembly constituency =

Assembly constituency in Bihar

Coordinates: 25.25°N 86.99°E

Bhagalpur
- Constituency No. 156 for the Bihar Legislative Assembly

Constituency details
- Country: India
- Region: East India
- State: Bihar
- District: Bhagalpur
- Lok Sabha constituency: Bhagalpur
- Established: 1951
- Reservation: None

Member of Legislative Assembly
- 18th Bihar Legislative Assembly
- Incumbent Rohit Pandey
- Party: BJP
- Alliance: NDA
- Elected year: 2025

Bhagalpur is one of 243 constituencies of legislative assembly of Bihar. It is a part of Bhagalpur Lok Sabha constituency along with other assembly constituencies viz. Gopalpur, Pirpainti, Kahalgaon, Bihpur and Nathnagar. In the 2015 Bihar Legislative Assembly election, Bhagalpur will be one of the 36 seats to have VVPAT enabled electronic voting machines.

== Overview ==
Bhagalpur comprises Bhagalpur (Municipal Corporation) of Jagdishpur CD Block.

== Members of the Legislative Assembly ==
Year	Member	Party
1952	Satyendra Narayan Agrawal	Indian National Congress
1957	Satyendra Narayan Agrawal	Indian National Congress
1962	Satyendra Narayan Agrawal	Indian National Congress
1967	Vijay Kumar Mitra	Bharatiya Jana Sangh
1969	Vijay Kumar Mitra	Bharatiya Jana Sangh
1972	Vijay Kumar Mitra	Bharatiya Jana Sangh
1977	Vijay Kumar Mitra	Janata Party
1980	Shiv Chandra Jha	Indian National Congress
1985	Shiv Chandra Jha	Indian National Congress
1990	Vijay Kumar Mitra	Bharatiya Janata Party
1995	Ashwini Kumar Choubey	Bharatiya Janata Party
2000	Ashwini Kumar Choubey	Bharatiya Janata Party
2005	Ashwini Kumar Choubey	Bharatiya Janata Party
2005	Ashwini Kumar Choubey	Bharatiya Janata Party
2010	Ashwini Kumar Choubey	Bharatiya Janata Party
2014^	Ajit Sharma	Indian National Congress
2015	Ajit Sharma	Indian National Congress
2020	Ajit Sharma	Indian National Congress
2025	Rohit Pandey	Bharatiya Janata Party

^by-election

== Election results ==
=== 2025 ===
2025 Bihar Legislative Assembly election: Bhagalpur
Party	Candidate	Votes	%	±%
BJP	Rohit Pandey	100,770	51.11	▲11.28
INC	Ajit Sharma	87,296	44.28	▲3.76
JSP	Abhay Kant Jha	3,251	1.65	
NOTA	None of the above	1,974	1.0	▲0.32
Majority		13,474	6.83	▲6.14
Turnout		197,146	57.21	▲8.78
BJP gain from INC		Swing		

=== 2020 ===
2020 Bihar Legislative Assembly election: Bhagalpur
Party	Candidate	Votes	%	±%
INC	Ajit Sharma	65,502	40.52	▼5.72
BJP	Rohit Pandey	64,389	39.83	▲0.58
LJP	Rajesh Verma	20,523	12.69	
Independent	Bijay Prasad Sah	3,292	2.04	
RLSP	Syed Shah Ali Sajjad Alam	2,743	1.7	
NOTA	None of the above	1,103	0.68	▼0.96
Majority		1,113	0.69	▼6.3
Turnout		161,673	48.43	▲0.26
INC hold		Swing		

=== 2015 ===
2015 Bihar legislative assembly election: Bhagalpur
Party	Candidate	Votes	%	±%
INC	Ajit Sharma	70,514	46.24	
BJP	Arjit Shashwat Choubey	59,856	39.25	
Independent	Bijay Pd. Sah	15,212	9.97	
NOTA	None of the above	2,500	1.64	
Majority		10,658	6.99	
Turnout		152,511	48.17	
INC hold		Swing		

=== 2014 bypoll ===
By-Election, 2014: Bhagalpur
Party	Candidate	Votes	%	±%
INC	Ajit Sharma	63,753	55.50	
BJP	Nabhay Kumar Chaudhary	46,524	40.50	
CPI	Mukesh Kumar Das	1,026	0.89	
SP	Khursheed	970	0.84	
NOTA	None of the Above	1,187	1.03	
Majority		17,229	15.00	
Turnout		1,14,859	36.81	
INC gain from BJP		Swing		

=== 2010 ===
2010 Bihar legislative assembly election: Bhagalpur
Party	Candidate	Votes	%	±%
BJP	Ashwini Kumar Choubey	49,164	42.03	
INC	Ajit Sharma	38,104	32.57	
LJP	Dr. N. K. Yadav	19,479	16.65	
BSP	Shekhar Mehtar	2,535	2.17	
Independent	Jajweer Quasmi	2,007	1.72	
Majority		11,060	9.46	
Turnout		1,16,987	42.97	
BJP hold		Swing		

== See also ==
- List of Assembly constituencies of Bihar
