= Ajay Kumar Mandal =

Indian politician

Ajay Mandal

Member of parliament, Lok Sabha
- Incumbent
- Assumed office 23 May 2019
- Preceded by: Shailesh Kumar Mandal
- Constituency: Bhagalpur

Personal details
- Party: Janata Dal (United)
- Occupation: Politician

Ajay Kumar Mandal is an Indian politician and Member of Parliament Lok Sabha. He was elected to the Lok Sabha, lower house of the Parliament of India from Bhagalpur in the 2019 Indian general election and in the 2024 Indian general election as member of the Janata Dal (United). He defeated Rashtriya Janata Dal candidate Shailesh Kumar Mandal by a big margin of 2,77,630 votes. He has been also elected three times for Bihar Legislative Assembly, two times from Nathnagar (Vidhan Sabha constituency) and one time from Kahalgaon (Vidhan Sabha constituency).

== Personal life ==
Ajay was born on 2 February 1978 in Bhagalpur district as elder son of Ramdas Mandal . He belongs to Hindu Gangota community .
