= Lutfur Rahman (poet) =

Urdu poet

Dr. Lutfur Rahman was a poet in the Urdu language.

== Political career ==
He successfully contested the election to be a Member of Legislative Assembly from Nathnagar constituency in Bihar. Later he became a cabinet minister and held two offices: Ministry of Minority Welfare and Ministry of Public Welfare Department.
