= Bihpur Assembly constituency =

Constituency of the Bihar legislative assembly in India

Bihpur
- Constituency No. 152 for the Bihar Legislative Assembly

Constituency details
- Country: India
- Region: East India
- State: Bihar
- District: Bhagalpur
- Lok Sabha constituency: Bhagalpur
- Established: 1951
- Reservation: None

Member of Legislative Assembly
- 18th Bihar Legislative Assembly
- Incumbent Kumar Shailendra
- Party: BJP
- Alliance: NDA
- Elected year: 2025

Bihpur is one of 243 constituencies of legislative assembly of Bihar. It is a part of the Bhagalpur Lok Sabha constituency along with other assembly constituencies viz. Gopalpur, Pirpainti, Kahalgaon, Bhagalpur and Nathnagar.

== Overview ==
Bihpur comprises CD Blocks Narayanpur, Bihpur & Kharik.

== Members of the Legislative Assembly ==
Year	Name	Party
1952	Raghunandan Prasad Jha	Indian National Congress
1957	Prabhu Narayan Roy	Communist Party of India
1962	Sukdeo Choudhary	Indian National Congress
1967	Gyaneshwar Prasad Yadav	Bharatiya Jana Sangh
1969	Prabhu Narayan Roy	Communist Party of India
1972	Prabhu Narayan Roy	Communist Party of India
1977	Sitaram Singh Azad	Communist Party of India
1980	Rajendra Prasad Sharma	Indian National Congress (I)
1985	Rajendra Prasad Sharma	Indian National Congress
1990	Brahmadeo Mandal	Janata Party
1995	Brahmadeo Mandal	Janata Dal
2000	Shailesh Mandal	Rashtriya Janata Dal
2005	Shailesh Mandal	Rashtriya Janata Dal
2005	Shailesh Mandal	Rashtriya Janata Dal
2010	Kumar Shailendra	Bharatiya Janata Party
2015	Varsha Rani	Rashtriya Janata Dal
2020	Kumar Shailendra	Bharatiya Janata Party
2025	Kumar Shailendra	Bharatiya Janata Party

== Election results ==
=== 2025 ===
Bihar Legislative Assembly Election, 2025:Bihpur
Party	Candidate	Votes	%	±%
BJP	Kumar Shailendra	91,458	52.39	+3.86
VIP	Arpana Kumari Mandal	61,433	35.19	
JSP	Pawan Choudhary	8,821	5.05	
Independent	Mamta Kumari	2,530	1.45	
Independent	Abnish Kumar	2,043	1.17	
NOTA	None of the above	3,269	1.87	+0.06
Majority		30,025	17.2	+13.12
Turnout		174,555	65.51	+7.46
BJP hold		Swing		

=== 2020 ===
Bihar Assembly election, 2020: Bihpur
Party	Candidate	Votes	%	±%
BJP	Kumar Shailendra	72,938	48.53	+9.07
RJD	Shailesh Kumar Mandal	66,809	44.45	−3.94
BSP	Md. Haidar Ali	3,553	2.36	
Independent	Md. Sanovar	1,364	0.91	
NOTA	None of the above	2,716	1.81	−0.69
Majority		6,129	4.08	−4.85
Turnout		150,289	58.05	+0.07
BJP gain from RJD		Swing		

=== 2015 ===
Bihar assembly elections, 2015: Bihpur
Party	Candidate	Votes	%	±%
RJD	Varsha Rani	68,963	48.39	
BJP	Kumar Shailendra	56,247	39.46	
Independent	Lal Bahadur Singh	4,141	2.91	
Independent	Haidar Ali	2,983	2.09	
JAP(L)	Ajmery Khatun	1,874	1.31	
NOTA	None of the above	3,565	2.5	
Majority		12,716	8.93	
Turnout		142,528	57.98	
