= Bihpur (community development block) =

Community Development Block in Bhagalpur, Bihar

Bihpur is a block in Bhagalpur district of Bihar, India. It is one of sixteen blocks under Bhagalpur district. According to Census 2011 , the sub-district code of Bihpur Block (CD) is 01330.It lies in the Anga Region of Bihar.

== Geography and Demographics ==
Total area of Bihpur block is 149 km². Bihpur subdivision has a population of 1,23,386 peoples. Bihpur has a population density of 826 inhabitants per square kilometre. There are about 23,503 houses in the sub-district. 0% of total population of Bihpur Block lives in Urban areas while 100% lives in Rural areas.

=== Religion ===
Religion	Total		Male	Female
Hindu	100,523	(81.66%)	53,129	46,394
Muslim	22,420	(17.98%)	12,309	11,111
Christian	65	(0.05%)	31	34
Sikh	15	(0.01%)	5	10
Buddhist	5	(0%)	4	1
Jain	5	(0%)	2	3
Other Religion	1	(0%)	1	0
No Religion Specified	352	(0.29%)	183	169

Religion in Bihpur Block
1. Hinduism (81.7%)
2. Islam (18.0%)
3. Others (0.35%)

=== Literacy Rate ===
Average literacy rate of Bihpur Block in 2011 were 60.26% in which, male and female literacy were 67.19% and 52.21% respectively. Total literate in Bihpur Block were 60,944 of which male and female were 36,506 and 24,438 respectively.

=== Language ===
Angika is the regional language in Bihpur Block. Hindi is the official language in the block and Urdu is the additional official language .

== Administration ==
According to Bihpur Gram Panchayati System, Bihpur is divided into 16 Gram Panchayats and 64 villages.

1.Ahuti

2.Amarpur

3.Babhangama

4.Baiswara

5.Bhagwatipur

6.Bihpur

7.Bikrampur

8.Bishunpur Gopal

9.Bishunpur Milik

10.Bishunpur Ramsahai

11.Dayalpur

12.Dharampur Ratti

13.Maksuspur

14.Garaia

15.Gauripur

16.Goari

17.Gobindpur Gobind

18.Hario

19.Hario Milik

20.Jairampur Nankar

21.Jairampur (Lathipur)

22.Jamalpur

23.Jamaluddinpur

24.Kaharpur

25.Kishunpur Banwari

26.Marwa

27.Mirma Chak

28.Muzaffarpur Sadik Milik

29.Nagarpara Arazi Milik

30.Narkatia

31.Peari Chak

32.Shah Chak

33.Bhramarpur

34.Sonbarsa

35.Tarbana

36.Tekwazpur

37.Thandapur

38.Tulsipur

39.Maheshpur
