= Kharhara =

- Small Town
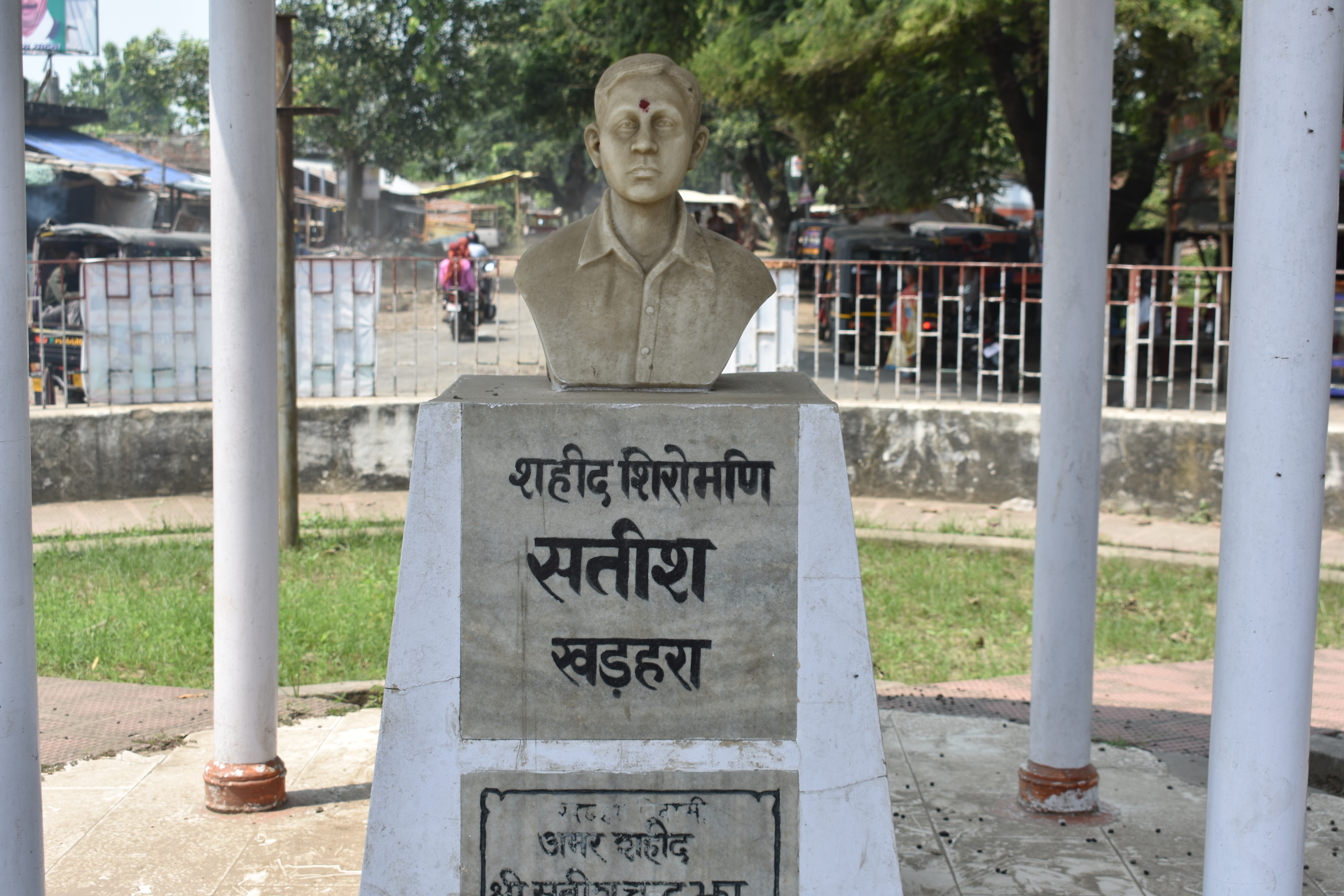
- Amar Shaheed Satish Chandra Jha

- Location in Bihar, India
- Coordinates: 24.88°N 86.92°E
- Country: India
- State: Bihar
- Division: Bhagalpur
- District: Banka
- Region: Ang Pradesh
- Elevation: 79 m (259 ft)

Population (2011)
  - Total: 12,086
  - Rank: 227

Languages
  - Official: Hindi
  - Additional official: Urdu
  - Regional: Angika
- Time zone: UTC+5:30 (IST)
- PIN: 813103
- Telephone code: 91 6424
- ISO 3166 code: IN-BR
- Vehicle registration: BR-51
- Sex ratio: 1.17 ♂/♀
- Nearest city: Bhagalpur
- Literacy: 75%
- Website: www.kharharanews.com

Kharhara is a small town in Banka district in the state of Bihar, India. It is the birthplace of Satish Chandra Jha, one of seven martyrs Shaheed Smarak Patna who hoisted the flag of India at Patna Secretariat during 1942 Quit India Movement.

== Geography ==
Kharahara is located at 24.88°N 86.92°E. It has an average elevation of 79 metres (259 feet).

== Demographics ==
According to Census 2011 information the location code of Kharhara is 241176. Kharhara is located in Barahat Tehsil of Banka district in Bihar, India. It is situated 4 km away from sub-district headquarter Barahat and 8 km away from district headquarter Banka. As per 2009 stats, Kharhara is the gram panchayat of Kharhara.

== Climate ==
Climate data for Kharhara, Banka
Month	Jan	Feb	Mar	Apr	May	Jun	Jul	Aug	Sep	Oct	Nov	Dec	Year
Record high °C (°F)	22 (72)	27.2 (81.0)	31 (88)	37 (99)	34 (93)	36 (97)	33 (91)	34 (93)	31 (88)	32 (90)	30 (86)	25 (77)	37 (99)
Record low °C (°F)	7 (45)	9 (48)	12 (54)	23 (73)	23 (73)	26 (79)	25 (77)	24 (75)	24 (75)	21 (70)	16 (61)	9 (48)	9 (48)

== Literacy ==
Total 8076 people in the small town are literate, among them 5330 are male and 2745 are female. Literacy rate (children under 6 are excluded) of Kharhara is 60%. 74% of male and 44% of female population are literate here. Overall literacy rate in the town has increased by 10%. Male literacy has gone up by 6% and female literacy rate has gone up by 16%.

Digital India is a campaign launched by the Government of India to ensure the Government's services are made available to citizens electronically by improved online infrastructure and by increasing Internet connectivity or making the country digitally empowered in the field of technology.

== Colleges ==
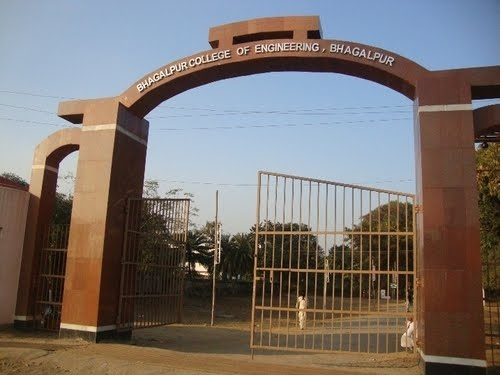
Bhagalpur College of Engineering

- Bhagalpur College of Engineering
- Bihar Agricultural University
- Indian Institute of Information Technology, Bhagalpur
- Mahadeo Singh Law College
- Marwari College, Bhagalpur
- Tilka Manjhi Bhagalpur University
- T.N.B. College, Bhagalpur

== Economy ==
Kharhara is an agricultural town. Still, the town has Industrial development with the Indian Oil Corporation.

== Notable people ==
- Satish Chandra Jha, Quit India movement (August 1942), to hoist the national flag on the (now) Secretariat building

== Transport ==
Bhagalpur Deoghar Road, Banka, Godda are the nearby by towns to Kharhara having road connectivity to Kharhara. Connected with NH 333A.

Barahat railway station, Punsia railway station are the very nearby railway stations to Kharhara. Murahara Railway Station (near to Banka), Banka Junction railway station (near to Banka) are the Rail way stations reachable from near by towns. However Bhagalpur Junction railway station is a major railway station 40 km from Kharhara

Deoghar Airport (ICAO: IN-0090) is located at New Deoghar, in the state of Jharkhand, India. However Deoghar Airport is major Airport 75 km from Kharhara

== Airlines and destinations ==
Airlines	Destinations	Refs.
IndiGo	Bangalore, Delhi, Kolkata, Patna, Ranchi	

== Tourism ==
Mandar Parvat also known as Mandar Hill is a small mountain situated in city of Bounsi. Digambar Jain Siddha Kshetra is located at the top of a mountain known as Mandar Parbat, which is about 500 metres (1,600 ft) tall and made of a single piece of stone. On top of the hill are a Hindu and a Jain temple. A carnival is organised every year at Makar Sakranti.
