= Diwakar Prasad Singh =

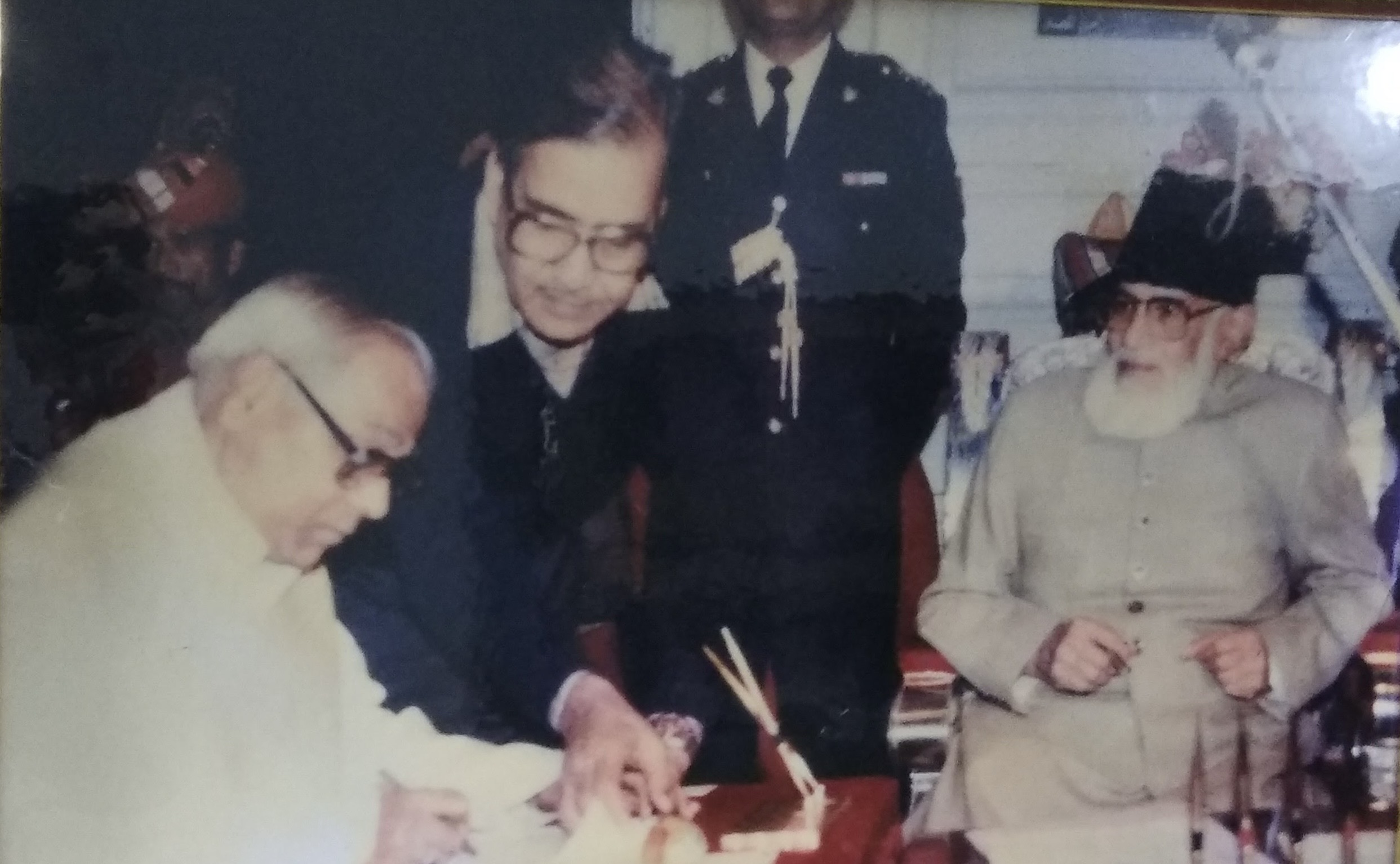
- Dr. Singh taking the oath of office as Minister of Education of Bihar in 1996.

Minister of Education, Bihar
- In office 1996–1996

Member of the Bihar Legislative Council
- Constituency: Kosi Graduate (Snatak)

Personal details
- Born: Banka, Bihar, India
- Died: 2010 (aged 79–80)
- Party: Indian National Congress
- Parent: Shashi Prasad Singh (Father)
- Education: University of Pennsylvania (PhD)
- Occupation: Academic, Politician

Diwakar Prasad Singh (died 2010) was an Indian academic and politician who served as the Minister of Education in the Government of Bihar. A member of the Indian National Congress, he represented the Kosi Graduate (Snatak) constituency as a Member of the Legislative Council (MLC).

== Early life and education ==
Singh was born in the Banka district of Bihar. He was the son of independence activist Shashi Prasad Singh, who was killed during the 1942 Quit India Movement.

He was a distinguished scholar and a Fulbright Fellow. He earned his PhD from the University of Pennsylvania, where he specialized in international history.

== Academic and Political Career ==
Prior to entering active politics, Dr. Singh was a noted historian. In 1974, he authored the scholarly work American Attitude Towards Indian National Movement, published by Munshiram Manoharlal with a foreword by the renowned historian Dr. R. S. Sharma.

In 1996, he was appointed to the Bihar Cabinet as the Minister of Education under Chief Minister Lalu Prasad Yadav. During his tenure, he was known for his efforts in higher education reform.

== Legacy ==
Dr. Singh was instrumental in preserving the legacy of his father. He played a central role in the establishment and development of the Shaheed Shashi Prasad Singh College in Shambhuganj, Banka. The college serves as a permanent affiliated unit of Tilka Manjhi Bhagalpur University, providing higher education to the rural population of the region.

== Gallery ==
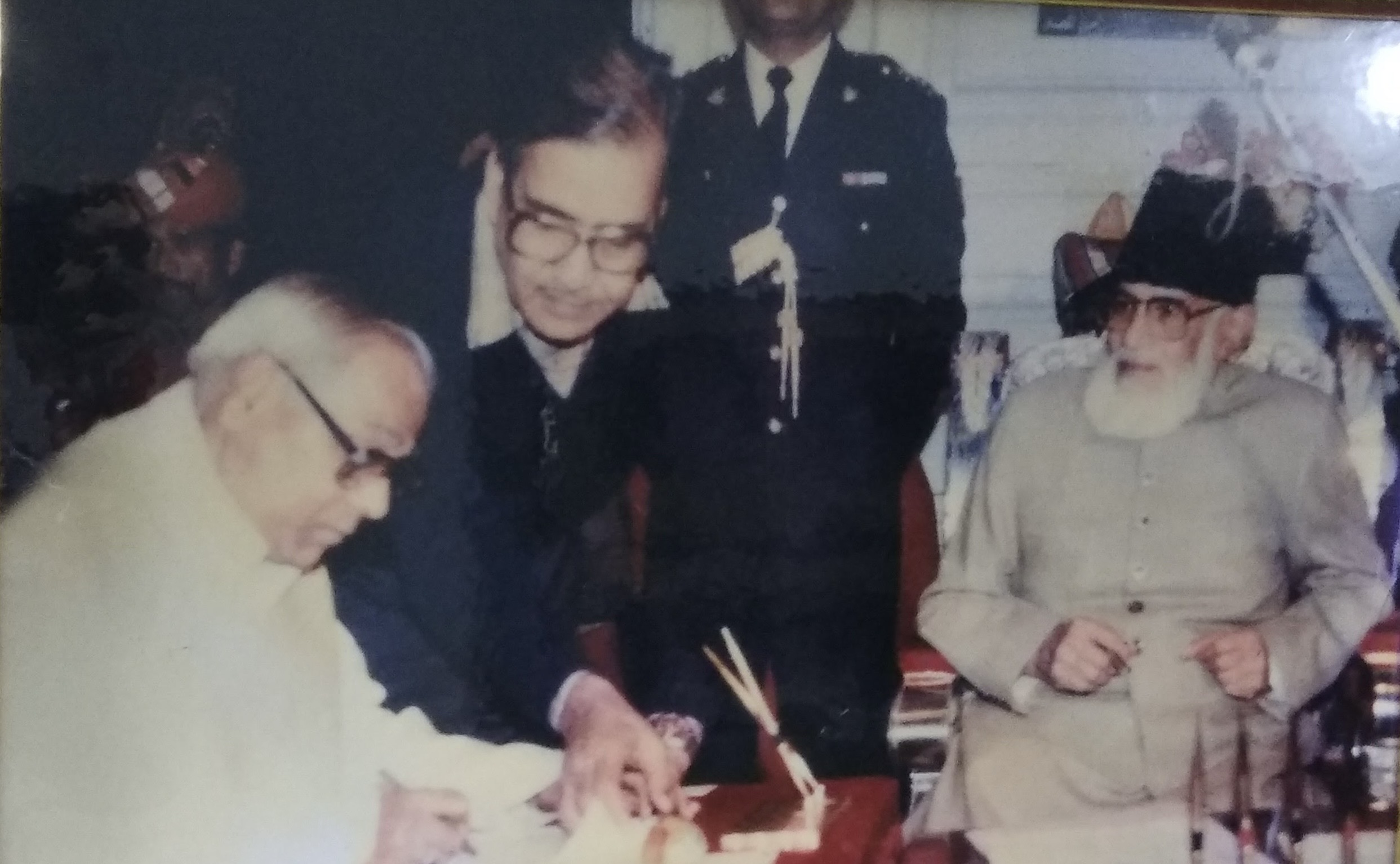
Taking the oath of office as Minister of Education, Bihar, 1996.

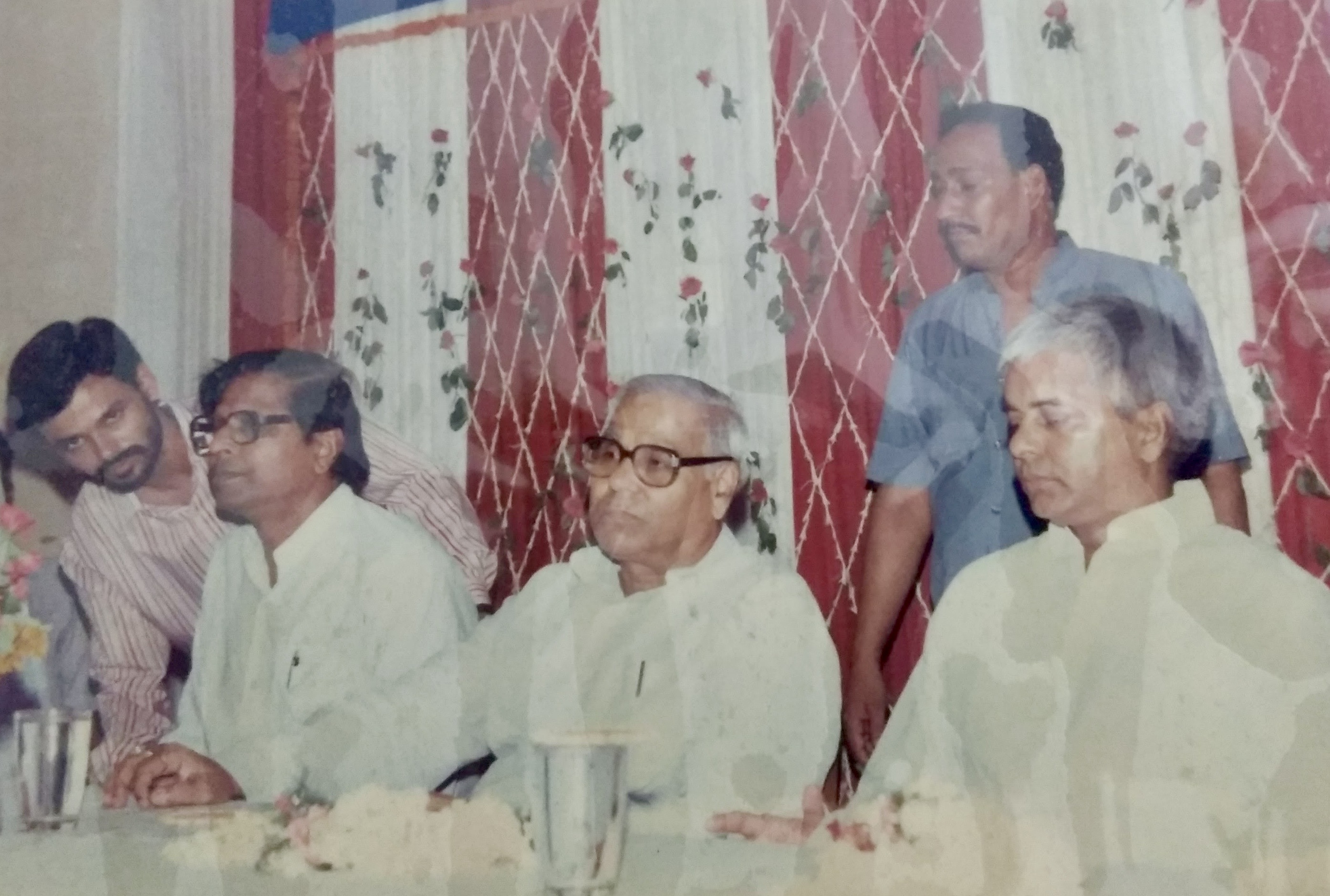
With then-Chief Minister Lalu Prasad Yadav.

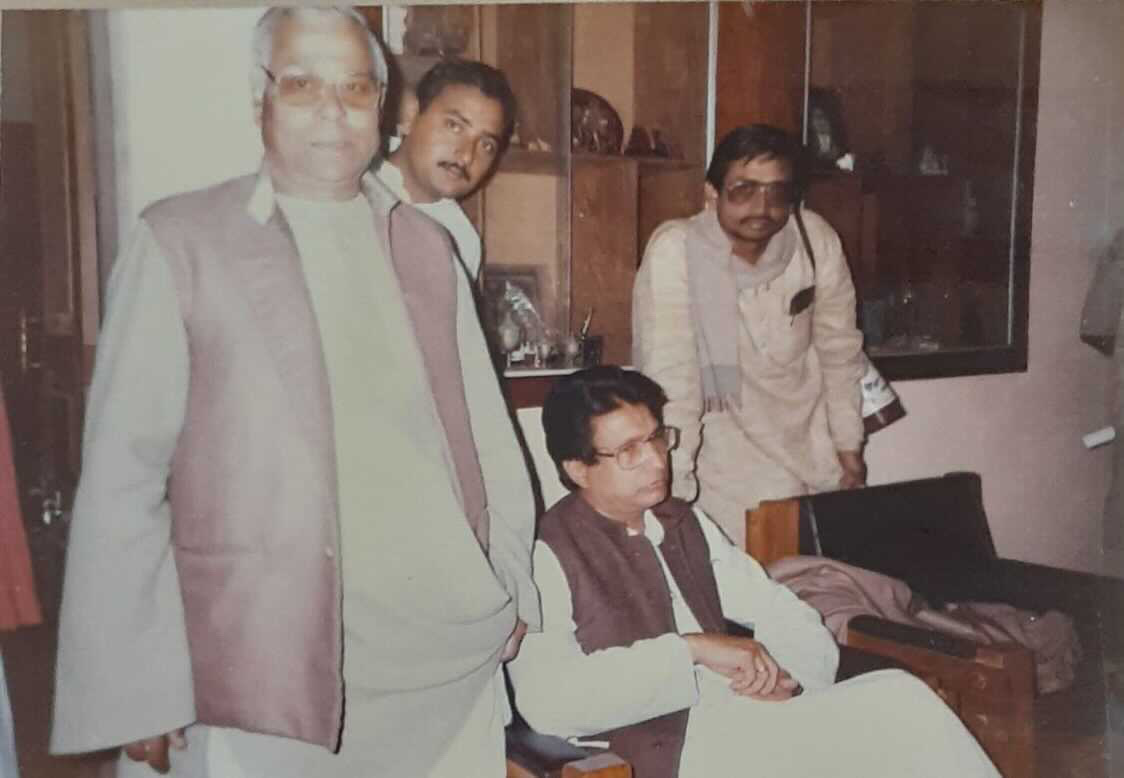
With Ajit Singh, founder of the Rashtriya Lok Dal.
