= Banka, Bihar =

Banka
- City
- Location in Bihar, India
- Coordinates: 24.88°N 86.92°E
- Country: India
- State: Bihar
- Division: Bhagalpur
- District: Banka
- Region: Ang Pradesh

Government
  - Type: State Government
  - Body: Government of India
- Elevation: 79 m (259 ft)

Population (2011)
  - Total: 45,977

Languages
  - Official: Hindi
  - Additional official: Urdu
  - Regional: Mondarika
- Time zone: UTC+5:30 (IST)
- PIN: 813102
- Telephone code: 91 6424
- ISO 3166 code: IN-BR
- Vehicle registration: BR-51
- Sex ratio: 1.17 ♂/♀
- Website: banka.nic.in

Banka is a city and a municipality serving as district headquarters. The city is historically very important because of Mandar Hill where Samudra Manthan has been occurred by Hindu rituals. The district was formed on 21 February 1991. It is a part of Anga region of Bihar.

== Demographics ==
As of 2001 India census, Banka had a population of 35,416, with 54% males and 46% females. The average literacy rate was 55%, lower than the national average of 59.5%, with 61% of the males and 39% of females literate; 16% of the population was under 6 years of age.
