= Amarpur, Banka =

Amarpur
- Town
- Location in Bihar, India
- Coordinates: 25.03°N 86.9°E
- Country: India
- State: Bihar
- District: Banka
- Elevation: 58 m (190 ft)

Population (2011)
  - Total: 25,336

Languages
  - Official: Angika, Hindi
- Time zone: UTC+5:30 (IST)
- PIN: 813101

Amarpur is a Nagar Panchayat in the district of Banka, Bihar. The city of Amarpur is divided into 14 wards for which elections are held every 5 years.

Amarpur Nagar Panchayat has total administration over 4,793 houses to which it supplies basic amenities like water and sewerage. It is also authorize to build roads within Nagar Panchayat limits and impose taxes on properties coming under its jurisdiction.

Amarpur is notified area in Banka district in the state of Bihar.

== Demographics ==
The Amarpur Nagar Panchayat has population of 25,336 of which 13,452 are males while 11,884 are females as per report released by Census India 2011.

The population of children aged 0-6 is 4186 which is 16.52% of total population of Amarpur (NP). In Amarpur Nagar Panchayat, the female sex ratio is 883 against state average of 918. Moreover, the child sex ratio in Amarpur is around 866 compared to Bihar state average of 935. The literacy rate of Amarpur city is 66.76% higher than the state average of 61.80%. In Amarpur, male literacy is around 72.54% while the female literacy rate is 60.24%.

== Market and livelihood ==
Amarpur market has a feel of both urban and rural India. Market comprises all the essentials of modern needs. Amarpur market is a hub for nearby villages.

Amarpur market is dominated by baniya community Bhagat Samaj and Saundik Samaj. Many retailer shop for clothes can be seen in market serving as wholeseller shop for small villages nearby. Jwellery shop also make a good chunk of Amarpur market. Core livelihood for many remains agriculture.

Sugarcane mills which used to be many in number 15–20 years ago have seen a great downfall due to non adopting of latest technology and lack of government support.

Peace environment of Amarpur due to minimal crime and urban nature of market make it a choice for villagers nearby to migrate from village to Amarpur city thus resulting huge land rate in market area and on Amarpur Bhagalpur SH 25 and Amarpur Shahkund Road.

== Employment ==
Due to lack of industries ,there is lack of opportunity of employment in Amarpur.

Amarpur Construction Company Private Limited is one of the oldest firm in this field, Amarpur as origin and head office. Das and company is a new entrant in construction industry from Amarpur city.
