= Naresh Pandey Chakor =

Indian editor

Dr. Naresh Pandey Chakor
- Born: 3 January 1938; Devdha, Sultanganj, Bhagalpur, Bihar
- Died: November 14, 2015 (aged 77); Patna
- Occupations: Writer, Poet, Editor, Statistical Officer
- Spouse: Droupadi Divyanshu (Died: 2016)
- Writing career
- Language: Angika, Hindi
- Notable works: Editing Ang Madhuri, a Monthly Magazine of Angika Language for 46 years
- Literary movement: Angika Language Movement

Dr. Naresh Pandey Chakor (3 January 1938 – 14 November 2015) was an Indian litterateur, editor, poet, and cultural activist from Bihar, India. He participated in the Angika language movement, publishing and editing the Angika monthly magazine 'Ang Madhuri' for 46 years.

== Early life and education ==
Naresh Pandey was born on 3 January 1938 in the village of Devdha, located approximately 15 kilometers south of Sultanganj in the Bhagalpur district of Bihar. His father was Shri Chandramohan Pandey, and his mother was Smt. Prajavati Devi.

He received his early education in his village and nearby schools, pursuing higher education at Bhagalpur University.

== Career ==
=== Government service ===
In 1963, Pandey began his professional career in the government, joining the Bihar State Khadi Gramodyog Board, Patna, as a Statistical Officer (सांख्यिकी पदाधिकारी). He served in this capacity until his retirement in 1996.

=== Angika Movement ===
Concurrent with his service, Pandey became deeply involved in the movement for the promotion and recognition of the Angika language. In 1961, he started his journey in the Angika language movement by joining the 'Ang Bhasha Parishad' as a Publicity Minister (प्रचार मंत्री). His first published work, the Angika one-act play "Kisan ka Jagaba" (किसान क॑ जगाबऽ), was released in 1961, marking it the first published book in the modern Angika language. In 1963, his Angika play Sarvoday Samaj (सर्वोदय समाज) became the first Angika book published by a government department.

Under the auspices of the 'Jahnvi Angika Sanskriti Sansthan' in Patna, he annually organized the 'Angika Mahotsav' (Angika Festival), often carrying heavy boxes of Angika books on his head to ensure their exhibition at the festival.

==== Ang Madhuri ====
Pandey was the editor of the monthly magazine Ang Madhuri. Beginning its publication and editing in December 1970, he helmed the magazine for 46 years until his death. His dedication to this work is often highlighted by comparison to other impactful Indian editors: Acharya Mahavir Prasad Dwivedi edited Saraswati for 18 years and Pandit Shri Ram Sharma edited Vishal Bharat for about two decades.

== Literature ==
Pandey published works that contributed to Angika and Hindi literature. He published around 80 books, encompassing independent writings as well as collaborative projects. In partnership with Dr. Abhayakant Choudhary, he co-authored and edited nine scholarly volumes that explored various aspects of the Angika language and literature, including its history, rhetoric (Alankara), emotional expression (Rasa-Vyanjana), and cultural dimensions reflected in folk songs. Additionally, nine books by different scholars have been written on Pandey’s life and literary contributions.

Owing to his literary contributions and influence, scholars and writers referred to him with epithets such as "Angika ka Bhartendu Harishchandra" and drew comparisons to figures like Mahavir Prasad Dwivedi, Tulsidas, Shakespeare and Kalidas.

== Death ==
Pandey 'Chakor' died in Patna on 14 November 2014.

== Selected bibliography ==
Pandey's bibliography spans various genres, including drama, poetry, cultural study, and translation:

=== Plays and drama ===
- Kisan ka Jagaba (अंगिका एकांकी - Angika One-Act Play)
- Ek Shaakh: Do Phool (हिन्दी नाटक - Hindi Play)
- Sarvoday Samaj (अंगिका नाटक - Angika Play)
- Shri Ram Janmotsav (अंगिका गीति-नाट्य - Angika Musical Drama)

=== Poetry and epics ===
- Bhorka Lali (अंगिका काव्य)
- Yayati (अंगिका काव्य)
- Hamar Sankirtan Yatra (अंगिका काव्य)
- Baba Thakur (अंगिका गाथा काव्य)
- Sawan Saloni (हिन्दी काव्य)
- Milan (हिन्दी कविता)
- Kisan: Desh ke Shaan (अंगिका कविता संग्रह)
- Bhakti Pushpanjali (Part I & II)

=== Novels and short stories ===
- Vishakha (अंगिका लघु उपन्यास - Angika Novella)
- Eblin (हिन्दी उपन्यास - Hindi Novel)
- Tilka Sundari Daar-Daar (अंगिका कहानी संग्रह - Angika Short Story Collection)
- Daan Ek Majboori (हिन्दी लघुकथा - Hindi Flash Fiction)

=== Cultural and research works (solo/edited) ===
- Angika Jatsaar (Edited)
- Angika Aandolan ka Itihas
- Angika Lok Sahitya
- Ang Janpad Gaurav: Haldhar Baba (Biography)
- Angjanpad Ke Vaivahik Vidhi Vidhan
- Mahatma Bholi Baba: Bhola Ke Avatar

=== Translations ===
- Angika Gita (Translation)
- Raghuvansham (Translation)
- Sukhla Gaachwala Jungle (Translation)

=== Works co-authored/edited with Dr. Abhayakant Choudhary ===
- Angika Sahitya Ka Itihas (Three Parts: First, Second, and Revised Edition)
- Angika Kavya Mein Ras Vyanjana
- Angika Mein Alankar
- Angika Lokgeeton Ka Sanskritik Adhyayan
- Angika Lohoikti Sangrah (Collection of Proverbs)
