= Mandar Vidyapith Halt railway station =

Railway station in Bihar

Mandar Vidyapith Halt

General information
- Location: State Highway 23, Dahua, Bounsi, Banka district, Bihar; India
- Coordinates: 24.834403°N 87.020258°E
- Elevation: 105 metres (344 ft)
- System: Indian Railways station
- Owner: Indian Railways
- Operator: Eastern Railway zone
- Line: Dumka–Bhagalpur line
- Platforms: 1
- Tracks: 2

Construction
- Structure type: At–grade
- Parking: Available

Other information
- Status: Functioning
- Station code: MDVD
- Zone(s): Eastern Railway zone
- Division(s): Malda
- Fare zone: Indian Railways

History
- Opened: 1907
- Rebuilt: 2012–15

Services
Preceding station	Indian Railways	Following station
Mandar Hill towards ?	Eastern Railway zone Dumka–Bhagalpur line	Panjwara Road towards ?
Location

Mandar Vidyapith Halt railway station (station code: MDVD), is a halt railway station on the Dumka–Bhagalpur line of Sahibganj loop under Malda railway division of the Eastern Railway Zone. The station is situated beside State Highway 23 at Dahua, Bounsi in Banka district in the Indian state of Bihar.

== History ==
The Broad Gauge section railway track from Bhagalpur Junction railway station to Mandar Hill railway station branch was opened in 1893. A new railway line from Mandar Hill to Hansdiha became operational on 23 December 2012 and Dumka to Barapalasi route was reconstructed in June 2014 and finally the full track became operational in 2015.
