= Katoria, Bihar =

Katoria
- Town
- State: Bihar
- District: Banka
- Elevation: 247 m (810 ft)

Population
  - Total: 146,613

Languages
  - Official: Hindi
  - Additional official: Urdu
  - Regional: Angika
- PIN: 813106

Katoria is a community development block and Nagar Panchayat in Banka district, Bihar, India. It is one of the part of 11 blocks that make up the Banka district. It is part of Banka Lok Sabha constituency along with other assembly constituencies; namely, Amarpur, Banka, Belhar and Dhoraiya. Katoria Block is bordered by Chanan Block towards the West, Phulidumar Block and Banka Block towards the North, Bausi Block towards the East. Banka, Deoghar, Jhajha, and Amarpur are the nearby markets to Katoria. Katoria consists of 223 Villages and 16 Panchayats. Jamua is the smallest Village and Katoria is the biggest Village.

== Geography ==
The nearest large cities to Katoria is Patna in Bihar, Ranchi in Jharkhand and Kolkata in west Bengal.

Radhanagar is a village near Katoria, located 4 km from the main market of Katoria.

Jaipur is a Village in Katoria Block in Banka District of Bihar State, India. It belongs to Bhagalpur Division . It is located 33 KM towards South from District head quarters Banka. 222 KM from State capital Patna. Jaipur Pin code is 813106 and postal head office is Katoria. Jaipur is surrounded by Chandan Block towards South, Mohanpur Block towards South, Deoghar Block towards South, Belhar Block towards North. Deoghar, Banka, Jhajha, Amarpur are the near by Cities to Jaipur.

== Transportation ==
From Baidyanath Dham Deoghar to Katoria can be reached by railway, bus, auto or taxi.

There are frequent buses which arrive regularly from Deoghar, Jasidih, Banka, Bhagalpur and Sultanganj. It is approximately 35 km from Deoghar. One can also hire a private auto rickshaw or car.

Katoria railway station is approximately 1.5 km from the centre. A few local train leaves daily between Jasidih/Deoghar and Banka. Jaisidih is on the main line and is well connected to all big cities. All major trains stop here, including Rajdhani and Shatabdi Express.

== Language ==
Angika is the local language in Katoria. Hindi and Santhali are also common languages.

== Population ==
The total population of Katoria Block is 146,613, living in 23,777 houses spread across a total of 223 villages and 16 Panchayats. The population consists of 76,328 males and 70,285 females.

== Weather and Climate of Katoria Block ==
In summer, the highest day temperature in Katoria is in between 29 °C to 44 °C . Average monthly temperatures: January 16 °C, February 20 °C, March 27 °C, April 32 °C, May 35 °C.
