= Bhitia =

Village in Bihar, India

Coordinates: 24°55′N 86°44′E

Bhitia or Bhitiya is a village 20 km from the district headquarters of Banka in Bihar, India. It is full of greenery and famous for its beautiful hills. The village has a big talab which attracts large numbers of immigrant birds. The village is 30 km from the Ganges. It is also famous for fish production.

The Naiyasi Tola of the area is the village of veteran leader Jai Prakash Mishra. Bhitia is the village of the homeopathic doctor, the late Dr. Rameshwar Mishra. It was in this soil that the major freedom fighter Shridhar Singh was born. Shridhar Singh hoisted the flag at the treasury at the age of 14. He was part of several major movements of the freedom struggle. Writer Bibhanshu Singh grandson of Shridhar Babu has written book Viplvi Banka.

In Tola Bhitia village, around 27.57% of the population belongs to Scheduled Castes, and about 0.07% to Scheduled Tribes.

One of the distinctive features of the region is its proximity from Deoghar (one among the 12 Jyotirlingas).

The linking road of "Uttarvahini Ganga" and "Babadham Deoghar" is 5 km from the village.

There is a Kali temple in the center of the village headquarters. Pilgrims visit there to worship Maa Kali. On the occasion of Dipawali, a Mela is organised. Kedia village of the locality has a famous old tree known as Dubethan.

Kamlesh Singh, a noted journalist, also popular as “Tau” from the weekly podcast “Teen Taal” on Aaj Tak, was born and raised in the by-lanes of Bhitia. Rajesh Kumar, another noted journalist was also born in the village. Mrs. Babita Bharti was elected in last Panchayat election as a Mukhiya of Bhitia.

== Agriculture ==
Paddy, wheat, maize, lentil.

== River ==
Lohagad

== Hills ==
Nada, Ramsariya

== Language ==
Angika
