= Shashi Prasad Singh =

Indian independence activist (died 1942)

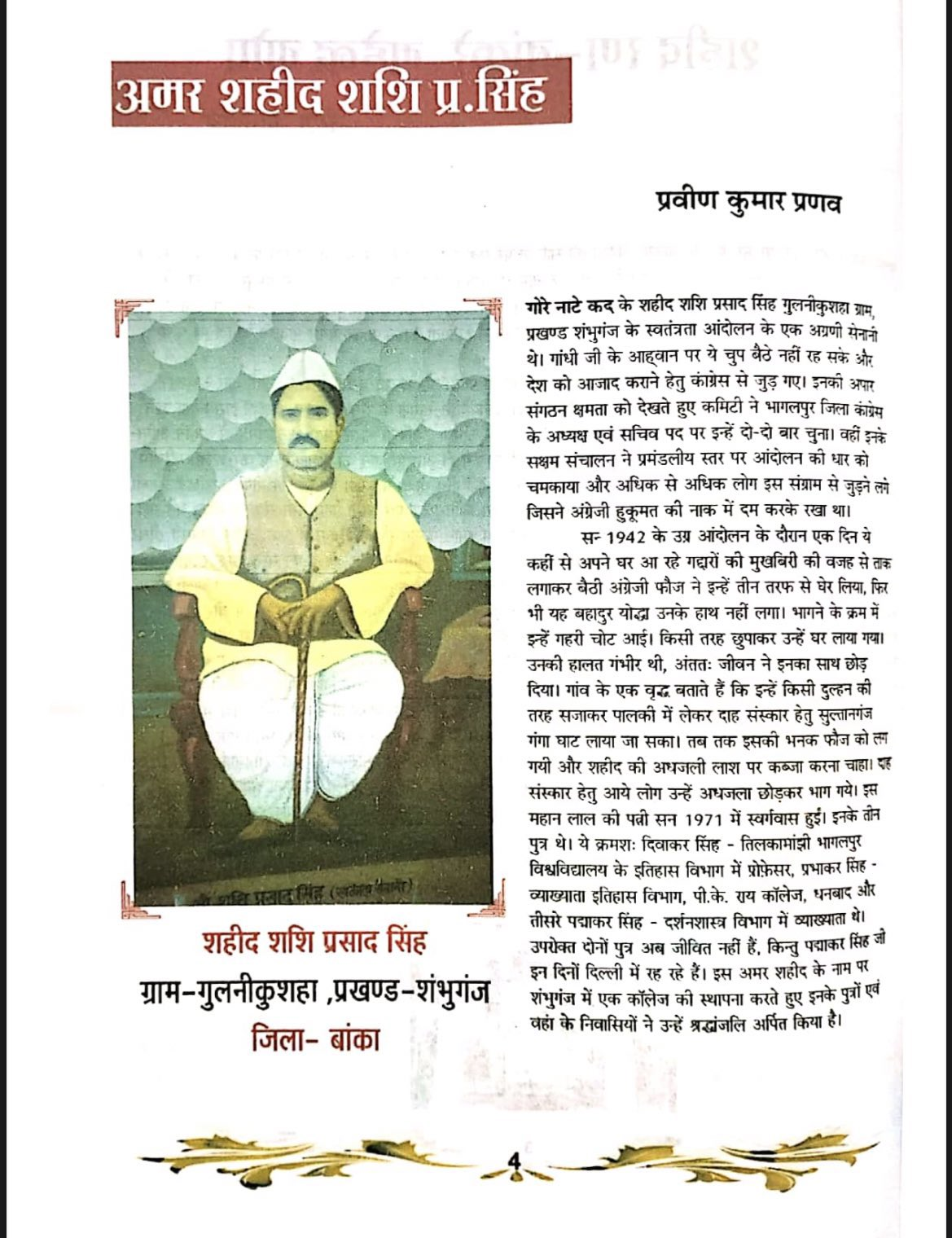
- Shashi Prasad Singh
- Born: Kusaha, Banka district, Bihar, British India
- Died: 29 November 1942; Belhar, Bhagalpur district, Bihar
- Cause of death: Police firing during Quit India Movement
- Occupation: Independence activist
- Organization: Indian National Congress
- Known for: Martyr of the 1942 Quit India Movement

Shashi Prasad Singh (died 29 November 1942) was an Indian independence activist from the Bhagalpur district of Bihar. He served as the General Secretary of the Bhagalpur District Congress Committee and is officially recognized as a martyr by the Government of India.

== Biography ==
Singh was born in Kusaha village, located in the Banka district. He was a member of the Indian National Congress and was active during the Civil Disobedience Movement, which led to his imprisonment in Hazaribagh and Bhagalpur jails.

During the Quit India Movement of 1942, he organized local resistance units known as the Panchayati Raksha Gram Seva Dal. His role in the protests at the Belhar police station is documented by historian K. K. Datta. Singh died on 29 November 1942 following a police firing incident during the movement.

== Legacy ==
The Shaheed Shashi Prasad Singh College in Sambhuganj, Banka, is named in his honor and is affiliated with Tilka Manjhi Bhagalpur University.

== Legacy and family ==
Singh's son, Diwakar Prasad Singh, was a prominent academic and politician who served as the Minister of Education of Bihar in 1996. He was also a noted professor at Bhagalpur University.
