= Khesar =

Village in Bihar, India

Coordinates: 24°41′N 84°28′E

Khesar is a small town in Banka district in Bihar state, India. The Postal Index Number is 813207.

Naxalite–Maoist extremists, suspected to be from the Communist Party of India (Maoist), in January 2006, attacked a police station, using explosives and weapons. Three policemen sustained serious injuries in the attack. Nearest railway station from Khesar is Banka Junction. Nearest airport is Patna.

Khesar is well connected by roads from Banka (district headquarter), Bhagalpur, Deoghar, Kolkata. There are 3 branches of nationalised bank, one post office and schools available.
