= Mahendra Gope =

Indian revolutionary (1912–1945)

- Born: 15 August 1912; Banka, Bihar and Orissa Province, British India
- Died: 23 November 1945 (aged 33); Bhagalpur, Bihar, British India
- Movement: Indian Independence Movement
- Criminal penalty: Death
- Criminal status: Executed by hanging

Mahendra Gope (15 August 1912 – 23 November 1945) was an Indian freedom struggle activist. He belonged to a Yadav family of Rampur, currently part of Banka district. At the age of 33, he was hanged in Bhagalpur Camp Jail in Bihar.

== Early life ==
Mahendra Gope was born on 15 August 1912 in Yadav family to Ram Sahay Khirhari, in Rampur village of the Banka district, in the state of Bihar.

== Revolutionary activities ==
In Bhagalpur, Parshuram Singh organised a group known as Parshuram Dal, this group chalked out a programme of taking revenge from sympathisers of British Government. The real strength of Parshuram Dal lay in Mahendra Gope, who emerged as great leader of this group.

During the Quit India movement Mahendra Gope and Parshuram Singh were important revolutionary leaders from south Bhagalpur, who gave open challenge to the government and killed a member of officers.

Gop gained a reputation as a ruthless operator and formed his own group within the wider Parshuram Dal movement. Later, Gope became independent and became leader of Gope Dal, particularly after the arrest of Parshuram Singh in May 1943.

Mahendra Gope and his group had links with Congress Socialist Party. In May 1943, his group also joined Siaram Singh's party but they were removed from the party for certain reason in June 1943.

== Death ==
During September 1944, Gope was arrested with ten others in the Banka jungles. He listed 20 people whom he suspected of informing against him.

On 23 November 1945, the British hanged Gope in Bhagalpur Camp Jail.

== Legacy ==
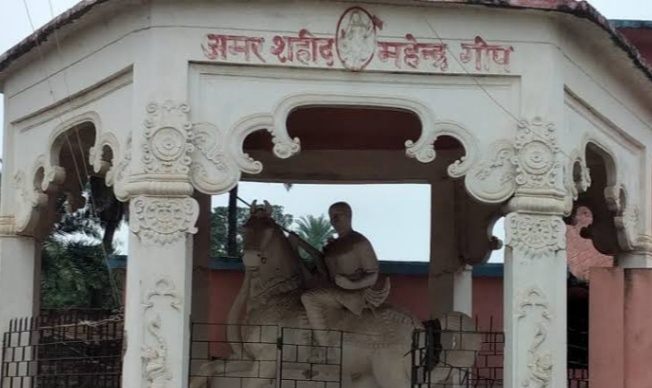
Statue of Mahendra Gop in Banka

A sports ground has been named after Gope at the Eksingha in Banka district. It is known as Amar Shaheed Mahendra Gope Stadium.
