= Angika people =

Indo-Aryan ethno-linguistic group from the Indian subcontinent

Angika People
अंग प्रदेशी

Total population
- c. 15 million

Regions with significant populations
- Anga region; India ( Eastern Bihar, Northeastern Jharkhand) and Nepal

Religion
- Majority: Hinduism; Minority: Islam · Buddhism · Jainism

Related ethnic groups
- Bengalis · Magadhis · Maithils

The Angika people (Devanagari: अंगिका), also known as Anga Pradeshi, are an Indo-Aryan cultural and ethno-linguistic group from the Indian subcontinent, who speak the Angika language as their native language.
