= T.N.B. College, Bhagalpur =

College in Bihar, India

- Type: Undergraduate and Postgraduate College
- Established: 1883
- Accreditation: Grade – 'A'
- Affiliations: Tilka Manjhi Bhagalpur University
- Principal: Prof. (Dr.) Dipo Mahto
- Location: Bhagalpur, Bihar, 812007, India
- Campus: 60 acres (24 ha); Urban
- Language: Hindi, English
- Website: tnbcollege.org

T.N.B. College, Bhagalpur, also known as Tej Narayan Banaili College, established in 1883, is one of the oldest general degree colleges in Bhagalpur, Bihar. It is a constituent college of Tilka Manjhi Bhagalpur University, and offers undergraduate and postgraduate courses in the science and arts.

The college is spread across a campus of around 60 acres and houses its own stadium.

== History ==
Tej Narain Banaili College is the second oldest college of higher learning in Bihar after Patna College. Collegiate education in Bhagalpur was identified with the Tej Narain Jubilee College, later renamed to Tej Narain Banaili College. It was established on 12 Feb. 1883, by Babu Tej Narain Sing (a local zamindar), with Intermediate level classes then called as F.A. under Calcutta University. Just after two years of the establishment of college, undergraduate and Post-graduate classes in some of the subject of Arts and degree class in Law were started in this college. It was at first a second grade College but in 1890 it was raised to its present status as a first grade Arts College. Law classes were opened then but they were abandoned as "affiliation in law" was refused to this college. In the year 1960, it was made a constituent college of Bhagalpur University.

== Departments ==
=== Science ===
- Chemistry
- Physics
- Mathematics
- Zoology
- Botany
- Biotechnology (Vocational)
- Computer Applications (Vocational)

=== Arts and Law ===
- English
- Hindi
- Urdu
- Sanskrit
- Geography
- Economics
- Political Science
- Sociology
- Philosophy
- Maithili
- History
- Law
