= Bhagalpur division =

Administrative division in Bihar, India

Bhagalpur Division
- Division of Bihar
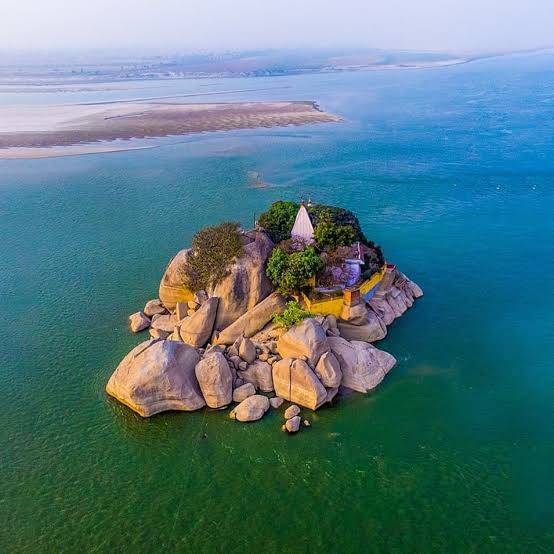
- Kahalgaon city mountain

- Location of Bhagalpur division in Bihar
- Coordinates: 25.25°N 87.0333°E
- Country: India
- State: Bihar
- Division: Bhagalpur
- Established: 1829
- Headquarters: Bhagalpur
- Districts: Bhagalpur, Banka

Government
  - MP - Banka: Giridhari Yadav
  - MP-Bhagalpur: Ajay Kumar Mandal

Population (2011)
  - Total: 5,061,565

Language
  - Official: Hindi
  - Additional official: English
  - Regional Language: Angika
  - Other: Bengali language, Khortha, Urdu, Santali

Bhagalpur division is one of the nine administrative units of Bihar, a state in the east of India. Bhagalpur city is the headquarters of the division, which was established in 1829 and is the oldest division of the state.

== History of administrative districts in Bhagalpur Division ==
The Bhagalpur Division was established in 1829 as the 12th division of the Bengal Presidency of British India, along with the Saran Division and Patna Division. At the time of its establishment, the Bhagalpur Division consisted of the districts of Munger, Bhagalpur and Purnia. In 1855, the Santhal Pargana district was added to the division, followed by Malda district in 1878. In 1905, Malda district was transferred from Bhagalpur Division to the Rajshahi Division. After independent, the Bhagalpur Division was reorganized into new five divisions were created: Munger, Bhagalpur, Purnia, Santhal Pargana and Kosi.

== List of subdivisions of Bhagalpur Division ==
Districts	Subdivisions
Banka	Banka
Bhagalpur	Bhagalpur
Bhagalpur	Kahalgaon
Bhagalpur	Naugachhia

== City and town in Bhagalpur Division ==
Bhagalpur is the largest city in the Bhagalpur Division, situated on the southern bank of the Ganges river. Bhagalpur's old name was Champanagri, the capital of the Anga Kingdom.

Kahalgaon (formerly known as Colgong during British rule) is a municipality and one of three subdivisions in Bhagalpur district in Bihar, India. It is located close to Vikramashila.

Banka is a town and the headquarters of the Banka district of Bihar.

Naugachhia is a town and an important railway station in the Bhagalpur district in the Indian state of Bihar. It is a block, one of three subdivisions of the Bhagalpur district, and a police district.

Sultanganj is a town and a block in Bhagalpur district of Bihar. It is located 25 km from Bhagalpur.

== See also ==
- Angika
- Divisions of Bihar
- Districts of Bihar

== Note ==
Population data obtained from the sum of the populations of the districts.
