= Shaheed Shashi Prasad Singh College =

Coordinates: 25.0915°N 86.7235°E

- Other names: S.S.P.S. College
- Type: Permanent Affiliated College
- Established: 1979
- Affiliations: Tilka Manjhi Bhagalpur University (TMBU)
- Officer in charge: Sunil Kumar Singh
- Principal: Prof. Diwakar Panjikar
- Location: Shambhuganj, Banka district, Bihar, India
- Campus: Rural
- Website: sspscollege.ac.in

Shaheed Shashi Prasad Singh College (commonly known as S.S.P.S. College) is a degree college located in Shambhuganj, Banka District, Bihar. Established in 1979, it is a permanently affiliated unit of Tilka Manjhi Bhagalpur University (TMBU).

== History and Namesake ==
The institution was founded in 1979 to provide higher education to the rural population of the Banka and Bhagalpur regions. It is named in honor of the independence activist and martyr Shashi Prasad Singh (also known as Shashi Babu). Singh was a prominent figure in the local freedom struggle, noted for his defiance of Salt Laws at Khajuria Hill in 1930. He was later martyred during the Quit India Movement in November 1942 while participating in an attack on the Belhar police station.

== Academics ==
The college offers three-year undergraduate degree programs (B.A., B.Sc., and B.Com.) recognized by the University Grants Commission (UGC), with a total student intake capacity of approximately 4,440.

- Arts (B.A.): Hindi, English, History, Political Science, Economics, and AIH & Culture.
- Science (B.Sc.): Physics, Chemistry, Mathematics, Botany, and Zoology.
- Commerce (B.Com.): Core Accountancy and Business subjects.

== Campus and Events ==
The college serves as a regional hub for educational and civic activities. In March 2025, the college organized the "Unnat Bihar, Viksit Bihar" program to mark Bihar Diwas. In February 2026, the institution hosted a "Youth Parliament" under the National Service Scheme (NSS), featuring debates on democracy and national development with over 130 student participants.

== Administration ==
The college administration is led by:

- Principal: Prof. Diwakar Panjikar
- Secretary: Sunil Kumar Singh
