= Mandar Hill =

Small mountain in Bounsi, India

Shri Mandar Parvat Tirth
- Mandar giri
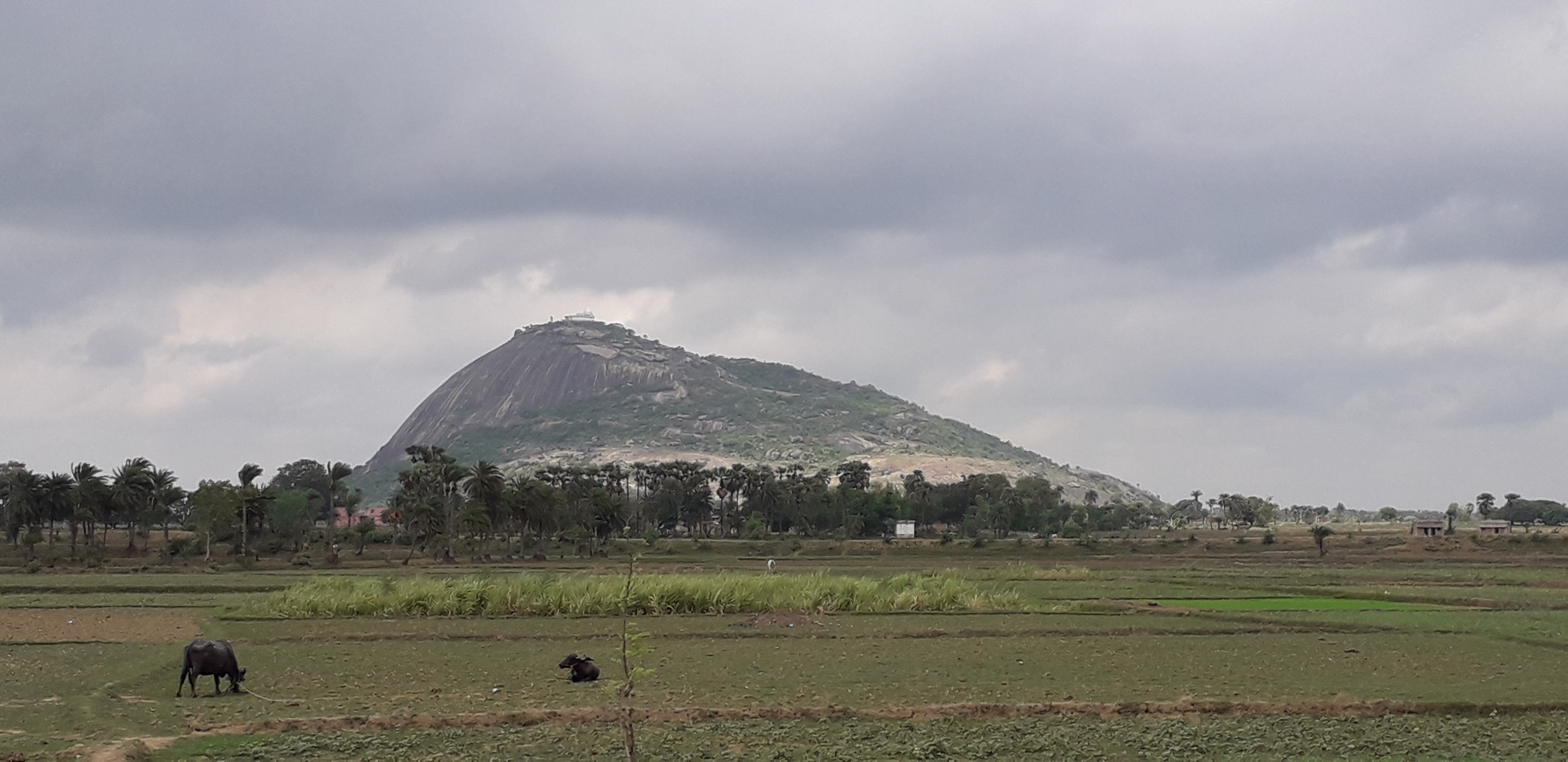

- Location within Bihar

Religion
- Affiliation: Jainism, Hinduism
- Deity: Vasupujya and Vishnu
- Festivals: Mahavir Jayanti, Makar Sankranti

Location
- Location: Banka district, Bihar, India
- Coordinates: 24°50′28″N 87°02′07″E

Architecture
- Temple: 12

Mandar Parvat, also known as Mandar Hill is a small mountain situated in Bounsi, Banka district under Bhagalpur division of state of Bihar. It is about 700 ft high and approximately 45 km south of Bhagalpur city of Bounsi, a place located on the state highway between Bhagalpur and Dumka. Mandar Hill is an important place of pilgrimage for both Jains and Hindus. A carnival is organised every year at Mahavir Jayanti & Makar Sakranti.

== History ==
Mandar hill is holds an important place in the religious history of South Bihar. It finds mention in various Puranas including the Varaha Purana and the Garuda Purana which associate it with stories of relating to Hindu deities like Vishnu and Shiva. The hill associated with the early medieval Later Gupta dynasty as an inscription from King Ādityasena has been found here dated to the mid-to-late 7th century CE and records the building of a temple on the hill.

== Religious Significance ==
=== Jainism ===
Mandar Parvat, is believed to place of three out of five kalnayak (Panch Kalyanaka) — diksha, kevala jnana, and nirvana of Vasupujya, the 12th tirthankara in Jainism.

=== Hinduism ===
The mountain has many references in Hindu Mythology as Mandarachal Parvat. As per references found in the Puranas and the Mahabharata, this hill was used for churning the ocean to extract the nectar from its bosom (Samudra Manthan). There is, adjacent to this hill, a pond called "Paapharni". In the middle of the pond is a temple of Lord Vishnu and Goddess Lakshmi.

Many rare sculptures of Lord Shiva, Kamadhenu and Varaha, believed to be of 11-12th century AD, can be found to be scattered around Mandar Hill. These rare artifacts need to be conserved by Archaeological Survey of India.

== Gallery ==
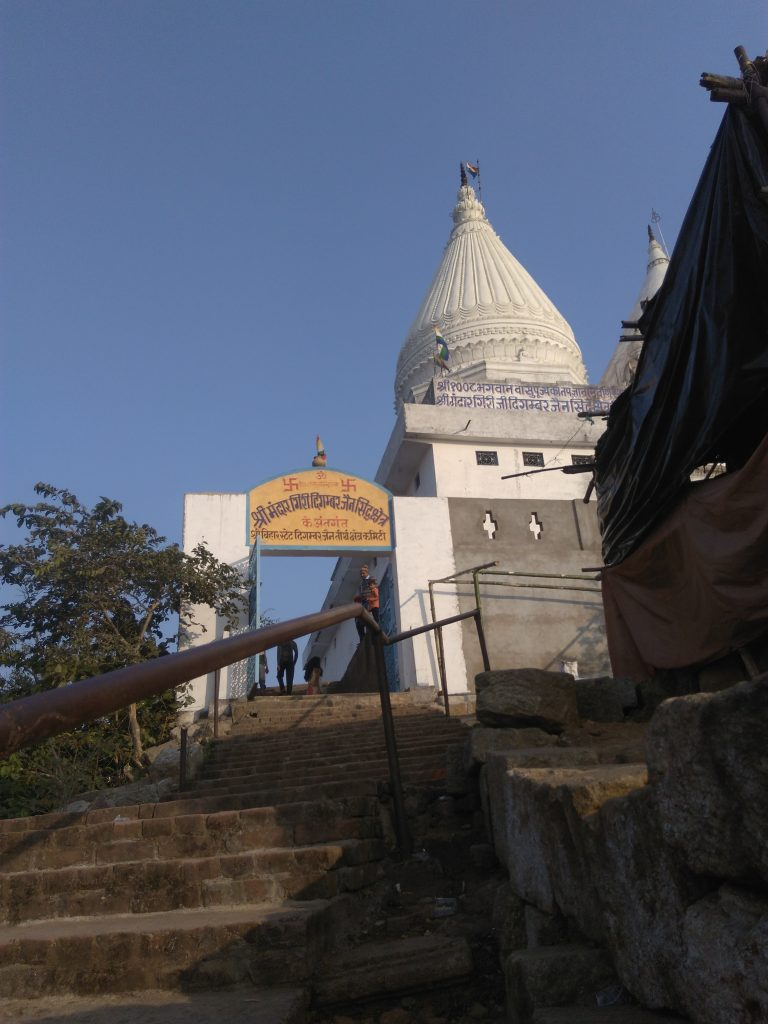
Vasupujya Jain temple

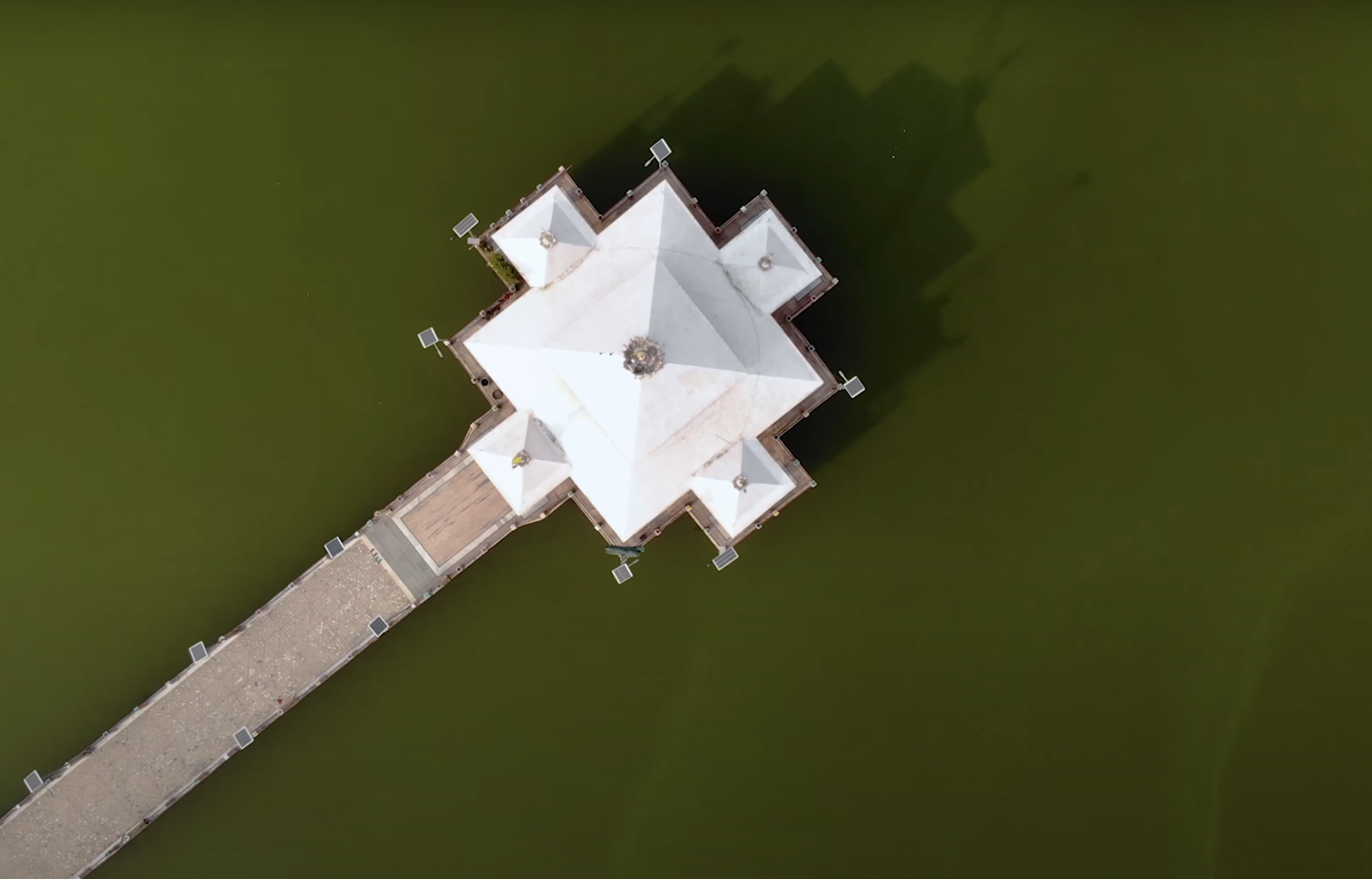
Vishnu temple

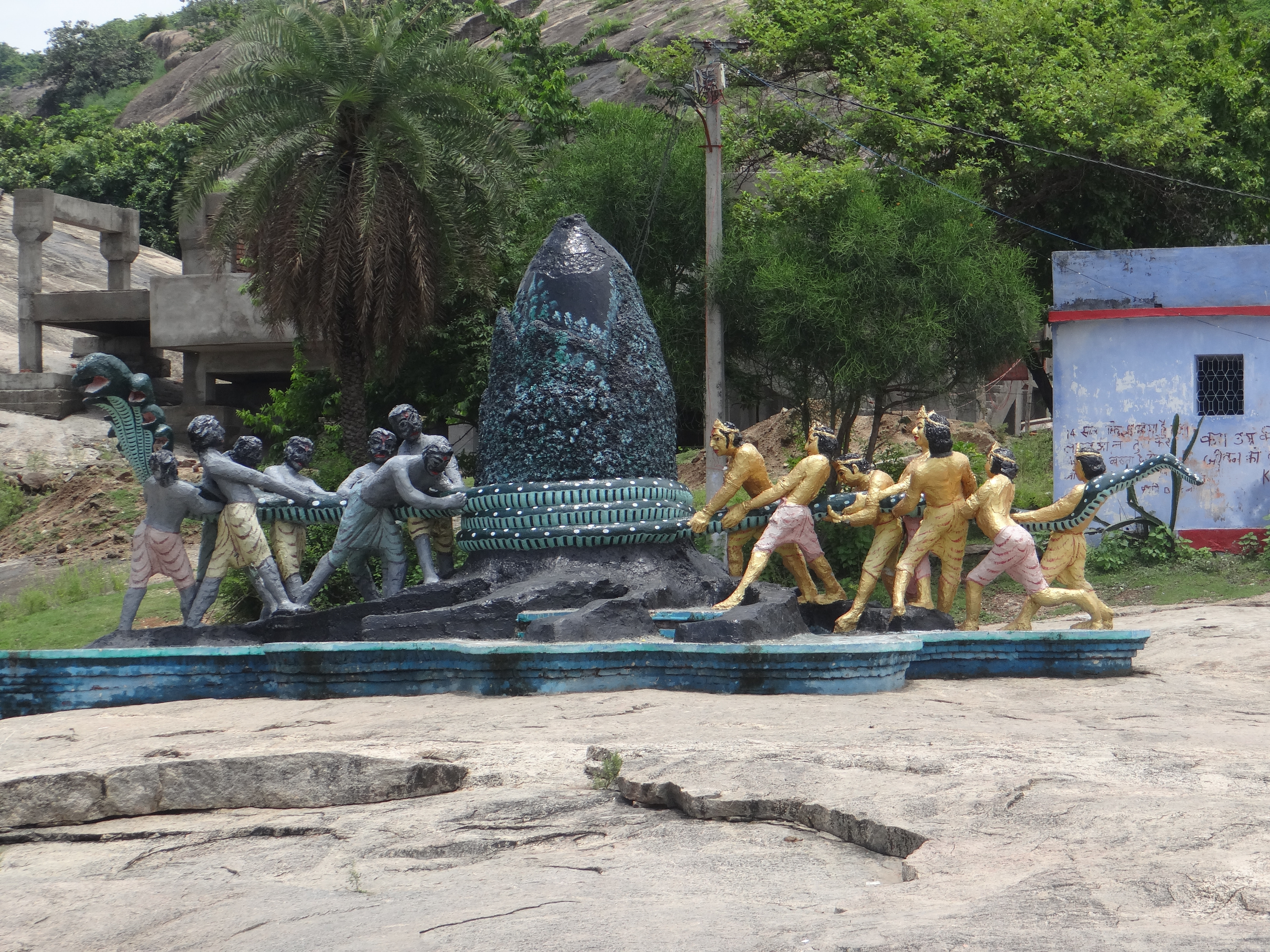
Depiction of Samudra Manthana
