= Tilka Manjhi Bhagalpur University =

Public university in Bhagalpur, Bihar, India

Tilka Majhi Bhagalpur University
- Former name: Bhagalpur University
- Motto: Tamso Ma Jyotirgayama (Sanskrit: "Take Me From The Darkness Unto Light")
- Type: Public
- Established: 12 July 1960; 66 years ago
- Affiliations: UGC
- Chancellor: Governor of Bihar
- Vice-Chancellor: Prof. (Dr.) Bimalendu Shekhar jha
- Location: Bhagalpur, Bihar, India; 25.249°N 86.958°E
- Campus: Urban
- Website: www.tmbuniv.ac.in

Tilka Majhi Bhagalpur University, formerly Bhagalpur University, is a public university in Bhagalpur, Bihar, India. It was established on 12 July 1960, having local colleges initially associated with Patna University. Its campus is around 264 acres (1.07 km^{2}) in area. The name was changed from Bhagalpur University to Tilka Manjhi Bhagalpur University in 1991 in commemoration of Tilka Majhi, a freedom fighter.

== Academics ==
T. M. Bhagalpur University has six faculties: science, social science, humanities, commerce, management studies, and law. It has five research centres: Agro-Economic Research Centre, Centre of Bioinformatics, University Computer Centre, Centre for Regional Studies and Research Service Centre.

== Colleges ==
Its jurisdiction extends over two districts, Banka and Bhagalpur.

=== Affiliated colleges ===
- A.K. Gopalan College, Sultanganj, Bhagalpur
- B. L. Sarraf Commerce College, Naugachia
- C.M. College, Bounsi, Banka
- D.N. Singh College, Bhusia, Rajaun, Banka
- L.N.B.J. Mahila College, Bhramarpur, Bhagalpur
- Mahadeo Singh College, Bhagalpur
- Muslim Minority College, Bhagalpur
- S.D.M.Y. College, Dhoraiya, Banka
- Shaheed Shashi Prasad Singh College, Shambhuganj, Banka
- Sharda Jhunjhunwala Mahila College, Bhagalpur
- Sarvajanik College Sarvodaynagar, Banka
- Tarar College, Tarar, Ghogha, Bhagalpur

=== Constituent Colleges ===
- T.N.B. College, Bhagalpur
- Bhagalpur National College
- G. B. College, Naugachia, Bhagalpur
- Jay Prakash College, Narayanpur
- Madan Ahilya Mahila College, Naugachia, Bhagalpur
- Marwari College, Bhagalpur
- Murarka College, Sultanganj
- P. B. S. College, Banka
- S. S. V. College, Kahalgaon
- Sabour College, Sabour, Bhagalpur
- Sunderwati Mahila College, Bhagalpur
- T.N.B law college, Bhagalpur

== Notable alumni ==
Name	Class year	Notability	Reference(s)
Aparajita Sarangi	S.M. College	Member of the Lok Sabha since 2019	
Jayant Raj Kushwaha	Marwari College, Bhagalpur, 2010	Minister of Rural Work Department of Bihar since 2021	
Nishikant Dubey		Member of the Lok Sabha since 2009	
Lalan Singh		Member of the Lok Sabha since 2019	
Satyanarayan Singh		Legislator	
