= Banka district =

District in Bihar, India

- District
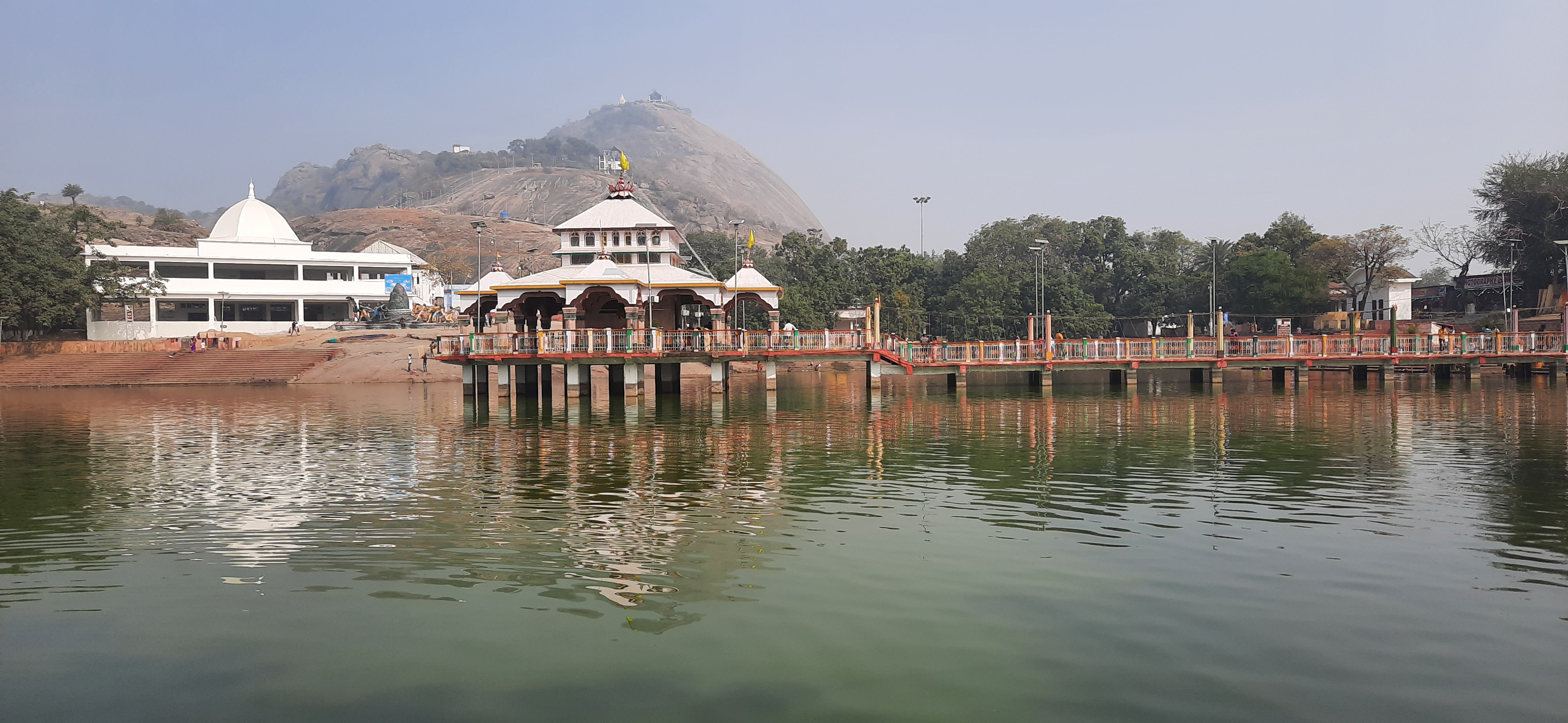
- Mandar Parvat
- Interactive map of Banka district
- Coordinates (Banka, Bihar): 24°52′48″N 86°55′12″E
- Country: India
- State: Bihar
- Division: Bhagalpur
- Headquarters: Banka

Government
  - Lok Sabha constituencies: Banka
  - Vidhan Sabha constituencies: Banka, Belhar, Amarpur, Katoria, Dhoraiya

Area
  - Total: 3,020 km^{2} (1,170 sq mi)

Population (2011)
  - Total: 2,034,763
  - Density: 674/km^{2} (1,750/sq mi)

Demographics
  - Literacy: 58.17%
  - Sex ratio: 907
- Time zone: UTC+05:30 (IST)
- Postal Index Number: 813101-813102
- STD Code: 06424
- Vehicle registration: BR-51
- Average annual precipitation: 1200 mm
- Website: banka.nic.in

Banka district ([/ˈbɑːŋkə/]) is a district in the southeastern region of the Indian state of Bihar. It is a part of Bhagalpur division. The district headquarters of Banka is situated in Banka town. The district was established on 21 February 1991.

== History ==
Banka is the homeland of the revolutionary Satish Prasad Jha, one of seven martyrs who hoisted the flag of India at the Secretariat building near Patna on 11 August 1942. Jha was born in Kharhara near Dhakamod. Bhubaneswar Mishra, a noted regional revolutionary from village Faga has contributed a lot in the freedom movement. He was sentenced to life imprisonment for killing many cruel British forces. Banka has been an attractive destination for veteran socialists. Banka played a vital role in the freedom of India. Banka also honors the memory of Shashi Prasad Singh, who served as the General Secretary of the Bhagalpur District Congress Committee and was martyred during the Quit India Movement in 1942. His legacy is preserved through the Shaheed Shashi Prasad Singh College in Shambhuganj, which serves as a major educational institution in the district.

Banka became a district on 21 February 1991.

== Geography ==
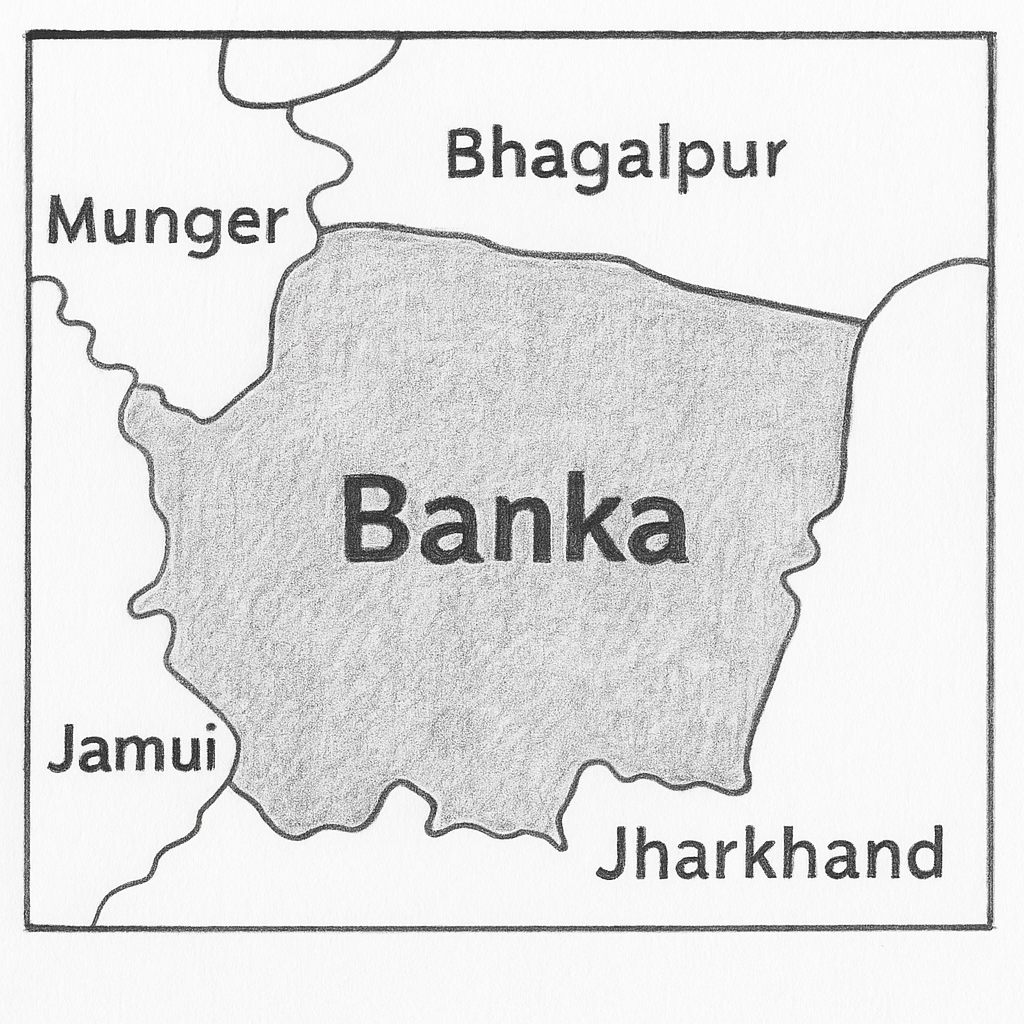
Map showing the boundaries of Banka district

The district is part of Bhagalpur division, has its headquarters in Banka town. Banka district occupies an area of 3,020 square kilometres (1,170 sq mi), comparatively equivalent to Canada's Akimiski Island. About 60% of the district consists of hilly regions (southern Banka). The northern part has alluvial plains. The Chanan is the main river of Banka along with the Badua and Burigeria rivers. 70% of cultivable land is used for paddy cultivation. Agriculture in southern Banka is rain–dependent.

=== Flora and fauna ===
The district has some forested area under Banka, Bounsi Katoriya forest ranges. The wood of Banka range lies on the hill slopes, those in the other two ranges lie in the undulating land. Among the prominent variety of trees in forested areas are the Sal which is usually found associated with Abuns, Asan, Kendu and Mahua. Tasar worms are reared on Asan trees. Some other trees are Bahera, Kadam, Amaltas. Among the specials of the Acacia are Babul, Sirish, and Sain Babul. Among the fruit trees, those of Mango and Jackfruit are common. Plantains, date plants, Plums, and Blackberry are some of the other important fruit trees.

Monkeys are common in the district, particularly the Hanuman, as well as Jackal, Deer, Lion, Bear, Leopards, and Elephants. Among the latter are Barsingha and Sambar. Wild geese, Duck, Leel, and Quail are some of the game birds inhabiting the district. Peacocks, Parrots, Hawks, and Doves are other birds found in Katoriya/Chandan forest. Sparrows, Crows and Vultures are also common.

Several kinds of fish, such as Rohu, Katla, Boari, Tengra, Bachwa, Jhinga, and Pothi, are found.

== Demographics ==
Historical population
| Year | Pop. | ±% p.a. |
|---|---|---|
| 1901 | 418,997 | — |
| 1911 | 426,110 | +0.17% |
| 1921 | 397,570 | −0.69% |
| 1931 | 458,161 | +1.43% |
| 1941 | 523,596 | +1.34% |
| 1951 | 587,760 | +1.16% |
| 1961 | 688,814 | +1.60% |
| 1971 | 840,749 | +2.01% |
| 1981 | 1,038,674 | +2.14% |
| 1991 | 1,292,504 | +2.21% |
| 2001 | 1,608,773 | +2.21% |
| 2011 | 2,034,763 | +2.38% |

Religions in Banka district (2011)
| Religion | Percent |
| Hinduism | 87.12% |
| Islam | 12.33% |
| Other or not stated | 0.55% |

According to the 2011 Indian census, Banka district has a population of 2,034,763, This gives it a ranking of 228th in India (out of a total of 640). The district has a population density of 672 inhabitants per square kilometre (1,740/sq mi). Its population growth rate from 2001 to 2011 was 26.14%. Banka has a sex ratio of 907 females for every 1000 males, and a literacy rate of 60.12%. 3.50% of the population lives in urban areas. Scheduled Castes and Scheduled Tribes made up 12.18% and 4.44% of the population respectively.

=== Religion ===
In the 2001 Indian census, it had a population of 1,608,773. There were 1,489,352 Hindus and 100,051 Muslims.

==== BY C.D. Blocks ====
| CD block | Hinduism | Islam | Others |
| Amarpur | 85.80% | 13.73% | 0.47% |
| Banka | 88.33% | 11.45% | 0.22% |
| Barahat | 79.85% | 19.97% | 0.18% |
| Belhar | 97.03% | 1.88% | 1.10% |
| Bausi | 82.92% | 15.38% | 1.70% |
| Chandan | 88.63% | 10.81% | 0.57% |
| Dhuraiya | 68.46% | 31.26% | 0.28% |
| Fullidumer | 98.11% | 1.64% | 0.25% |
| Katoria | 91.59% | 7.42% | 0.89% |
| Rajoun | 94.32% | 5.53% | 0.15% |
| Shambhuganj | 91.85% | 7.96% | 0.18% |

=== Languages ===
Languages of Banka district (2011)
1. 'Other' Hindi (82.0%)
2. Hindi (8.32%)
3. Santali (4.20%)
4. Urdu (4.03%)
5. Others (1.40%)

Banka falls within the Angikā-speaking region of eastern and southern Bihar, alongside neighbouring districts such as Bhagalpur, Munger, and parts of Santal Parganas region. Although Angikā is not included in the Eighth Schedule of the Indian Constitution, there have been ongoing demands for its official recognition.

At the time of the 2011 Indian census, 8.32% of the population in the district spoke Hindi, 4.20% Santali, and 4.03% Urdu as their first language. 82.05% of the population spoke Other languages recorded under Hindi on the census.

== Politics ==
Madhu Limaye represented the Banka Lok Sabha constituency twice. George Fernandes and Raj Narain also contested the parliamentary election in this constituency. There were also a number of veteran leaders of the Indian National Congress: Vindhyavasini Devi, MLA (1957–1967); Shakuntala Devi, ex MP; ex-chief minister of Bihar Chandrashekhar Singh, Chaturbhuj Singh Ex. MLA; ex-Rajya Sabha MP Kamakhya Prasad Singh, ex-MP Manorama Singh; and ex-MLA Jai Prakash Mishra. Digvijay Singh (14 November 1955 – 24 June 2010) was an independent who represented Banka in the Lok Sabha, the lower house of the Indian Parliament.

Digvijay Singh served as a Member of the Parliament of India five times – three times in the Lok Sabha (1998, 1999, and 2009) and two times in the Rajya Sabha (1990 and 2004). He served as Union Minister of State during the Atal Bihari Vajpayee government (1999–2004) and the Chandra Shekhar government (1990–1991). He was also a successful sports administrator, having served as president of the National Rifle Association of India since 1999. He was one of the three (George Fernandes, Digvijay Singh, and Nitish Kumar) founding members of the Samta Party.

As of 2025, Banka constituency is represented in the Parliament of India by Giridhari Yadav who won by a margin of 2,00,532 votes.

| District | No. | Constituency | Name | Party | Alliance | Remarks |
|---|---|---|---|---|---|---|
| Banka | 159 | Amarpur | Jayant Raj Kushwaha | JD(U) | NDA | |
| Banka | 160 | Dhoraiya (SC) | Manish Kumar | JD(U) | NDA | |
| Banka | 161 | Banka | Ramnarayan Mandal | BJP | NDA | |
| Banka | 162 | Katoria (ST) | Puran Lal Tudu | BJP | NDA | |
| Banka | 163 | Belhar | Manoj Yadav | JD(U) | NDA | |

=== Subdivisions and blocks ===
The district comprises only one subsdivision, Banka, which is further divided into eleven blocks: Banka, Amarpur, Shambhuganj, Belhar, Fullidumar, Katoria, Chandan, Baunsi, Barahat, Dhoraiya, and Rajoun.

== Economy ==
Banka is gradually becoming a religious tourism hotspot for Hinduism and Jainism. Old Mandar Parvat (also known as Mandarachal Parvat in Puran) is home to many religious attractions. A Jain temple at the summit, in close proximity to a Vishnu temple, is a sign of religious tolerance. Every year in January, Bounsi Mela is organised, which depicts the village life of the Mandar region. A Ratha-Yatra procession of Lord Madhusudanah occurs every year on the same day as the Ratha-Yatra procession in Puri. Fourteenth-century Vaishnava saint Chaitanya Mahaprabhu started this Ratha-Yatra during his visit to Mandar.

Banka is a largely agrarian economy and is considered the "rice bowl" of Bihar. The main crops are rice, wheat, corn, and lentils. The Amarpur belt produces sugar cane and is home to gur sugar mills.

An issue for many smaller village industries in Bihar is the lack of branding for products. High-quality, locally produced goods, even in large volumes, contribute to lower earnings for business owners because of a lack of awareness of more profitable business practices.

Banka is strategically located near the source of raw materials for heavy industries. Its proximity to Jharkhand (bordering Deoghar, Dumka, and Godda) and the River Chandan makes it a very strong contender for coal-based power plant investment and other heavy industry. There is a 4000 MW thermal power plant is planned in Kakwara village. Abhijeet Group has planned to build a 1320 MW thermal power plant at Baunsi. Ericsson Power Ltd has planned to set up a 1320 MW thermal power plant at Prabhawati Nagar. Dalmia Power has planned to set up a 1320 MW coal-based thermal power project in Dona village.

In 2006, the Indian government named Banka one of the country's 250 most backward districts (out of a total of 640). It is one of the 38 districts in Bihar currently receiving funds from the Backward Regions Grant Fund Programme (BRGF).

== Culture ==
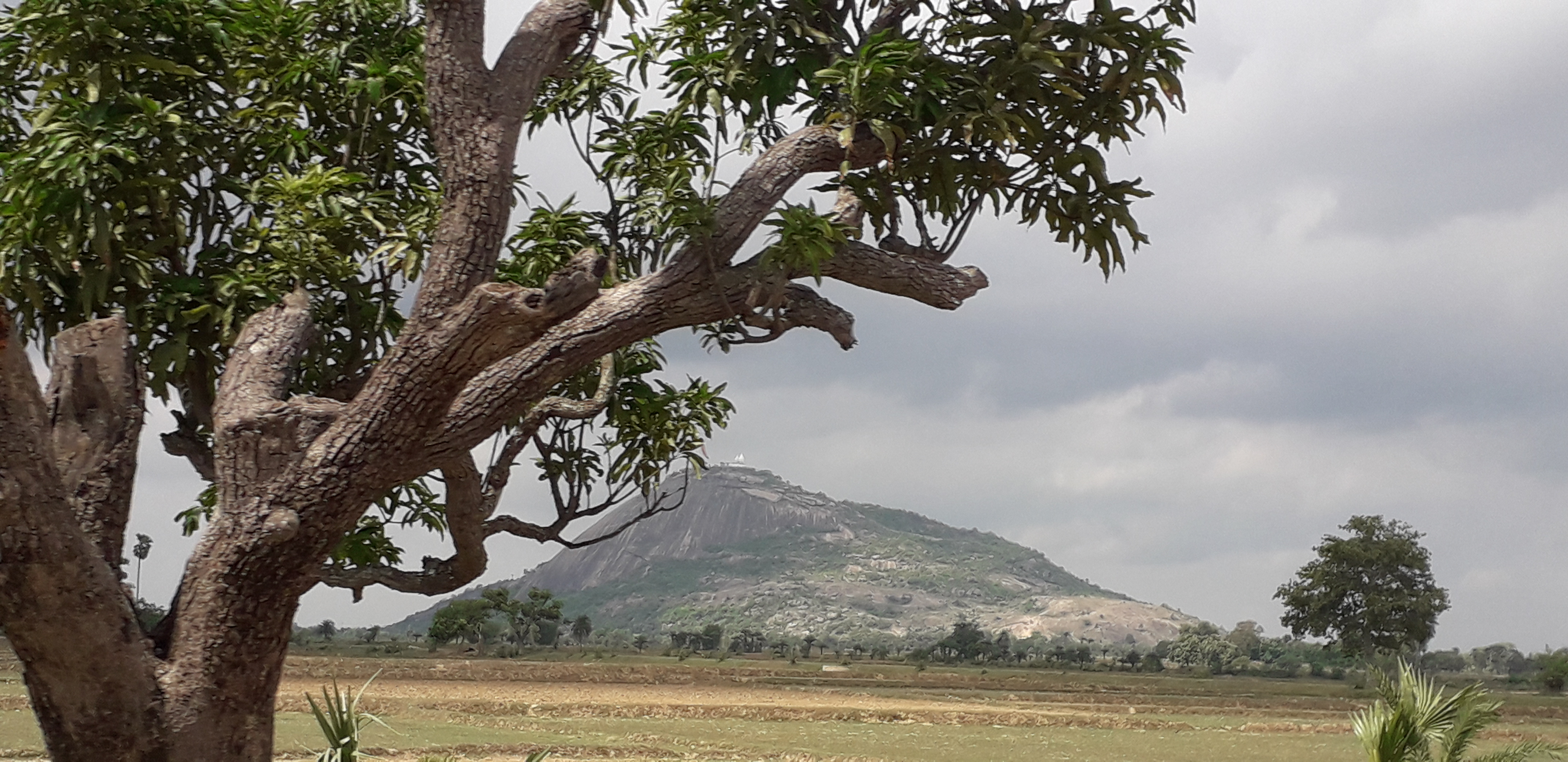
Mandar Parvat

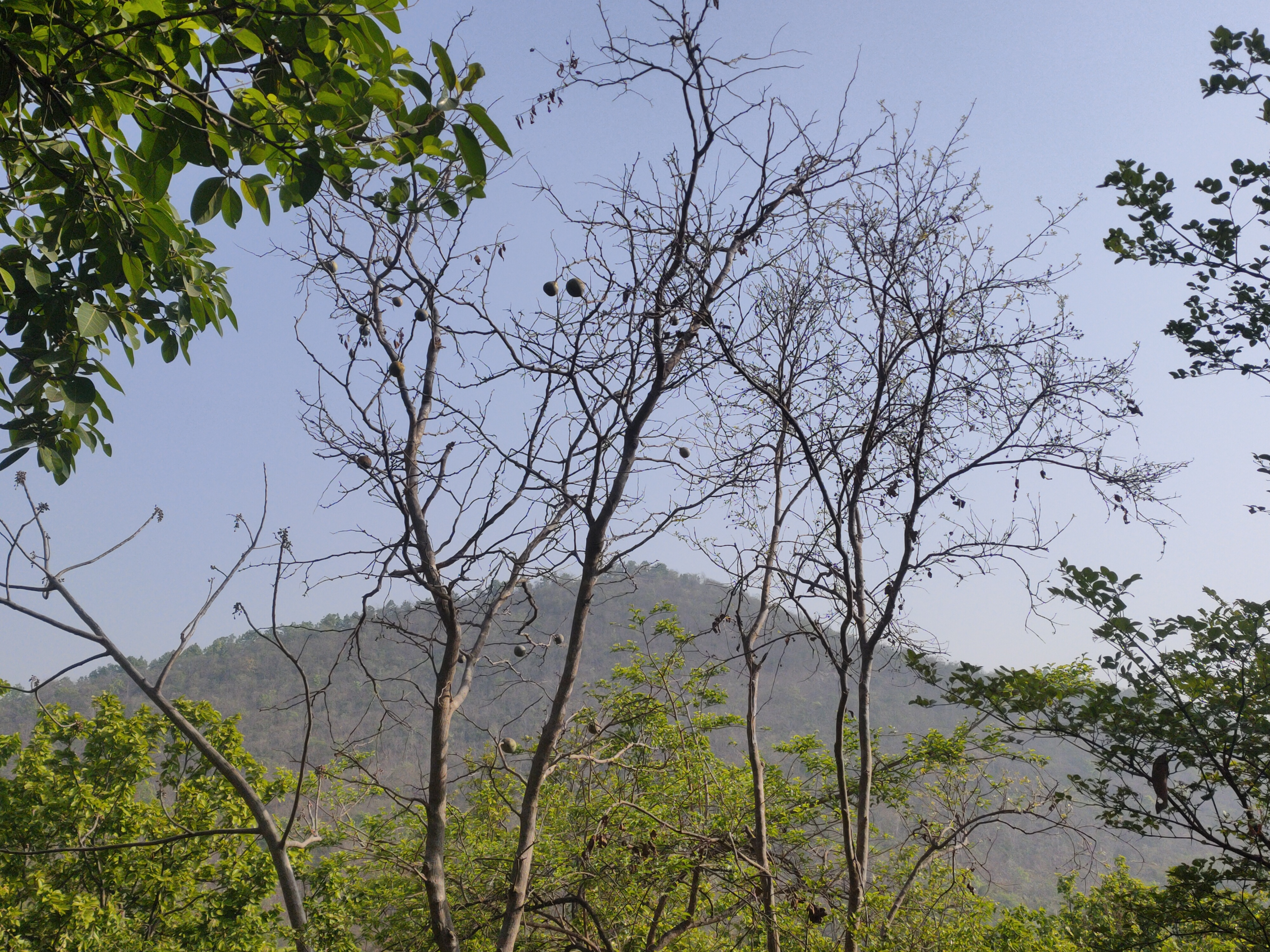
Suiya Pahad

A temple dedicated to the Hindu goddess Durga is located in Banka. Every year during Durga Puja, devotees from many parts of India visit this temple. Two temples-Narshimha (one of the incarnations of Vishnu and the other one of goddess Kali) Temple and Digamber Jain Tirthanakar-are located at the top of a mountain known as Mandar Parbat, which is about 500 metres (1,600 ft) tall and made of a single piece of stone. The management of the Narshimha temple is under a trust. Another temple, Avantika Nath, is located at the bottom of Mandar Parbat. The Avantika Nath Temple Trust, founded by the late Babu Biro Singh of the village of Sabalpur, maintains the temple. A temple of Lord Shiva is in Jethore hill near Chanan River. The literal meaning of Jethore is "jyesth" meaning elder Gaur means brother of Deoghar temple. Maa Kali Mandir in Kamalpur village is another temple. A Mahalakshmi temple is located in front of Paapharni Pond.

Recently, Lakshminarayan Temple was built in the centre of Paapharni through the contributions of locals. It is managed by a trust headed by Fateh Bahadur Singh of erstwhile Sabalpur state. 3 kilometres (1.9 mi) east of Rajoun village Mahada is situated, which has goddesses Durga Mandir and Kali Mandir, and god Shiva Mandir.

The district is known for its rich tribal culture and its handicrafts and handlooms. The homemade Khadi and silk of the area are popular. Most of the raw silk cocoon is produced in Katoria; in fact, major part of the raw materials required for silk industry in Bhagalpur is supplied from Katoria.

=== Tourism ===
Mandargiri Digambar Jain Siddha Kshetra is located at the top of a mountain known as Mandar Parbat, which is about 500 metres (1,600 ft) tall and made of a single piece of stone. This place is related to the three Kalyanka-Tup (penance), Keval Gyan (omniscience), & Moksha of Bhagawan Vasupujya. It means that this is the place where Vasupujya Swami accepted penance, achieved the supernatural knowledge and finally got salvation. Moolnayak of this temple is a coral-coloured idol of Lord Vasupujya in Padmasana posture. A 5-foot tall statue of Vasupoojya is also present here. The temple also has a Dharamshala equipped with modern facilities.

== Transport ==
A railway line connects the existing Bhagalpur with Jasidih and Rampurhat, which is well-connected to Howrah. Banka is also connected to Patna, the capital of Bihar, by a dedicated Express train.

== Education ==
Banka district has one Government college, PBS College.

Other colleges and universities include DNS College, Pt Tarni Jha Women College, and Shyama Charan Vidyapeeth.

== Notable people ==
- Mahendra Gope
- Giridhari Yadav
- Shashi Prasad Singh – Independence activist and martyr of the Quit India Movement (1942); the Shaheed Shashi Prasad Singh College in Shambhuganj is named in his honor.
