= Angika =

Eastern Indo-Aryan language

- अंगिका; अङ्गिका; অঙ্গিকা; 𑂃𑂑𑂹𑂏𑂱𑂍𑂰; Aṁgikā, Aṅgikā
- The word "Angika" written in Devanagari script
- Pronunciation: [ɐ̃ŋgiˈka]
- Native to: India and Nepal
- Region: Anga (eastern Bihar and northeastern Jharkhand, as well as Morang and Sunsari districts, Nepal)
- Ethnicity: Angika people
- Native speakers: Unknown; officially 1,100,000 (2024) (undercount in census data) (Note: The figures significantly undercount Angika because census practices register speakers under "Hindi", and societal and official pressure lead many Angika-speakers to report Hindi as their mother tongue.)
- Language family: Indo-European: Indo-Iranian; Indo-Aryan; Eastern; Angika
- Early forms: Magadhi Prakrit: Magadhan Apabhraṃśa; Abahaṭ‌ṭha
- Dialects: Northern (Dharampuria); Central (Bhagalpuria); Thethi (Mungeria)
- Writing system: Devanagari

Official status
- Official language in: India: Jharkhand (second state language)
- Recognised minority language in: Nepal (protected under mother-tongue provisions)

Language codes
- ISO 639-2: anp
- ISO 639-3: anp
- Glottolog: angi1238
- Linguasphere: 59-AAF-sk
- Map of eastern India and Nepal showing the region where Angika is spoken.

- Classified as "Vulnerable" (VU) by UNESCO's Atlas of the world's languages in danger.

Angika (also known as Anga, Angikar or Chhika-Chhiki) is an eastern Indo-Aryan language spoken primarily in the Anga region of eastern Bihar, northeastern Jharkhand, parts of West Bengal, and the Terai region of Nepal.

Angika is closely related to neighbouring Indic languages such as Maithili, Bengali, Bhojpuri and Magahi.

Angika has been declared as an additional official language of Jharkhand.

== Controversy around relationship with Maithili ==
There is an ongoing debate over whether Angika is a dialect of Maithili or a distinct language. British linguist George Abraham Grierson classified Angika as a dialect of Maithili in his Linguistic Survey of India (early 20th century). Rahul Sankrityayan classified Angika as a distinct dialect, separate from the Maithili spoken in Darbhanga and Madhubani. His works from the 1950s popularized the term "Angika" for what George Grierson had earlier classified as the "Chhika-Chhiki" southern dialect of Maithili in the Linguistic Survey of India (1903).

After the Maithili movement of the 1960s–70s, centred on primary education in Maithili, inclusion in the Eighth Schedule, and eventually a separate Mithila state, Maithili activists saw the sudden assertion of Angika and Bajjika as independent identities as a counter-movement. They believed that the Bihar government and the pro-Hindi Bihar Rashtrabhasha Parishad encouraged these claims to weaken the social base of Maithili politics.

In this view, Angika and Bajjika were treated as Maithili dialects or regional varieties, historically classified within the Maithili linguistic continuum. Promoting them as “separate languages” was therefore seen as an attempt to split a once-unified Mithila identity into competing linguistic constituencies.

== Official status ==
Angika is not listed in , the 8th schedule of the constitution of India.

Angika has the status of "Second State language" in the Indian state of Jharkhand since 2018. It shares this status with 15 other languages, including Maithili.

== Literature ==
Very little written literature exists in Angika, largely because it was not established as a literary language. Most of the literary corpus in Angika dates from the early 20th century onward.

Naresh Pandey Chakor wrote the first ever novel in Angika titled Kisan Ke Jagab.

== Vocabulary ==
=== Sample Vocabulary ===
Everyday nouns

- dokān: 'shop'

Animals

- kuttā: 'dog'
- ṭikṭikiyā: 'lizard'
- leru / leruyā: 'calf (young)'

Plants & crops

- nemu: 'lemon'
- cāur: 'paddy; unhusked rice' (also in Magahi and Maithili)
- ketārī / ketāṛī: 'sugarcane'
- bāṅgā: 'cotton'

Food items

- manda / maṇra: 'maize bread'

Pronouns & address

- apne: formal/honorific 2nd-person 'you'

Postpositions / case markers (illustrative)

- -ra, -ker: genitive 'of'
- -san: ablative 'from' (e.g., hamrāsan 'from me')

Semantic notes

- ḍābl (< Eng. double): 'very big' (intensifier) in colloquial use.

=== Sample sentences ===
- हम जायछी। (Ham jāychhī): 'I am going.'
- हम गेलीये। (Ham geliye): 'I went.'
- हम जैबै। (ham jaibai): 'I will go.'
- ई की छिकै। (ī kī chhikai): 'What is this?'

== Anga region ==
Angika is mainly spoken in south-eastern Bihar, including most of Munger, the whole of Bhagalpur division and some south eastern parts of Purnia division along with the Santhal Pargana division of Jharkhand. Its speakers number around 15 million people. The region where Angika is spoken is popularly known as Anga, Ang Pradesh and Angika-Belt. Apart from Bihar and Jharkhand states of India, it is also spoken in the Morang district of Nepalese Terai as a minority language. 1.9% people of Morang returned Angika as their mother tongue during the 2011 Nepal census.

== Angika culture ==
=== Festival ===
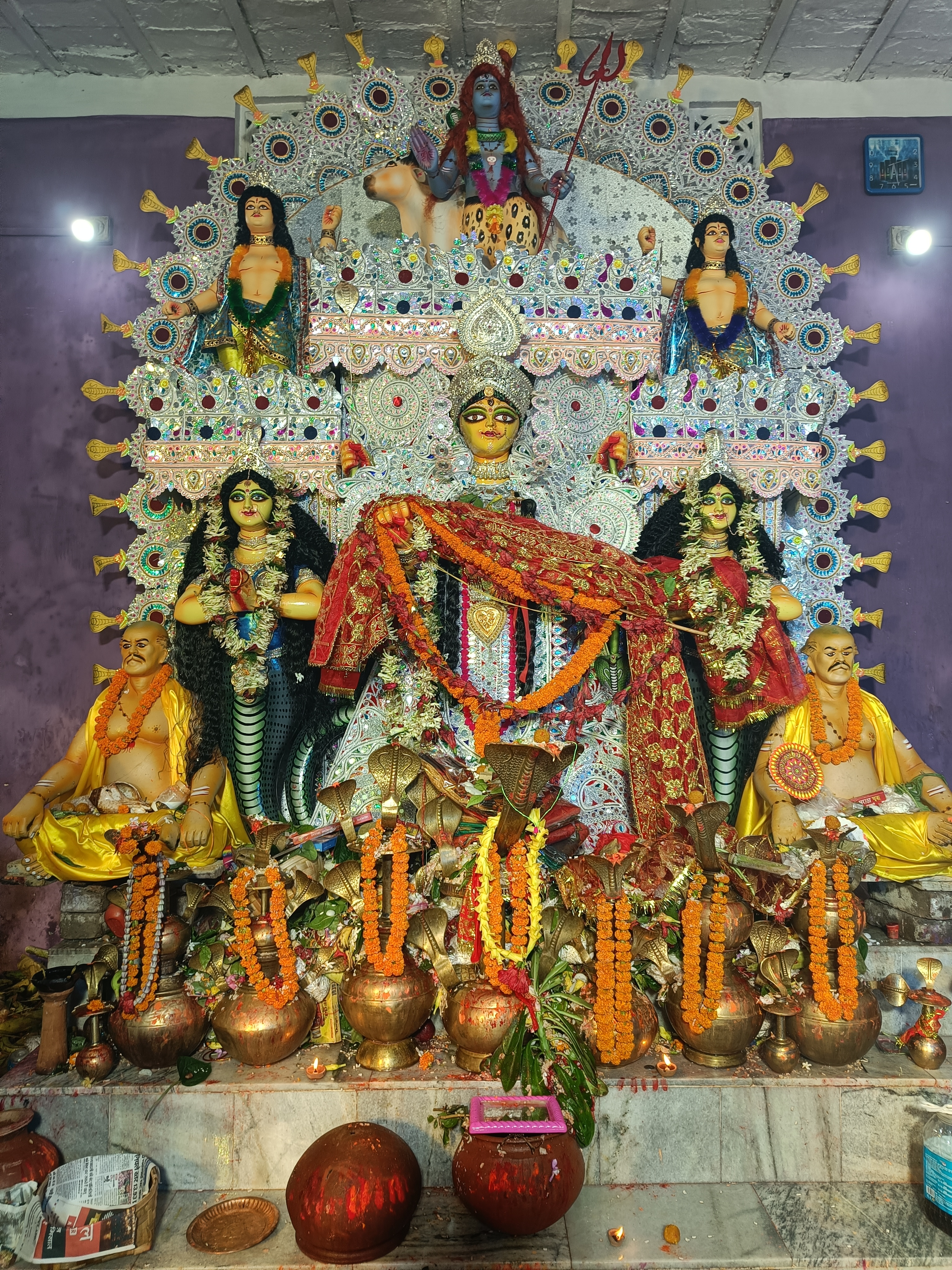
Mansa Puja (Vishari Puja), the folk festival of Anga Region, celebration in Deepnagar Chowk, Bhagalpur.

Festivals are the core part cultural part of the community. Anga celebrates the festivals of all daith with great enthusiasm and zeal. However, Manasa Puja (Based on Behula Vishahari folklore) and Kali Puja are two examples of intangible cultural heritage of the region. Apart from these, Durga Puja, Saraswati Puja, Chhath Puja, Biswakarma Puja, Kali Puja, Basanti Puja, Holi and Karma-Dharma puja too hold a great significance for the region.

- Manasa Puja (Bihula-Vishari Puja)

Bihula Bishari folk story narrated by folklorist Ranvir Singh

Manasa Puja is the folk festival In Bihar's Ang region. It is the biggest festival of Anga. Champapuri the capital of Ang Pradesh is the main temple of Maa Vishari. Maa Manasa is regarded as Goddess of Serpants. Even today, the tradition of Manasa (Bihula-Vishhari) Puja, which has been going on since mythological times, continues. Mata Mansa is worshiped in Bihula-Vishhari. Maa Mansa is said to be the daughter of Shiva and the sister of Vasuki sitting as a garland around Mahadev's neck. Mythological beliefs of Bihula Vishhari story of Champanagar of Ang Pradesh are spread everywhere. Its facts are also found in the remains of Vikramshila even two historical murtis of Maa Manasa have been found from the ruins.

- Kali Puja

Anga is famous for the way of its Kali Puja Celebration which is one of the most celebrated festivals of the whole region. Together with Manasa Puja, it is intangible cultural heritage festival of Anga.

- Chhath Puja

As per Legends, Chhath Puja stems from the early Vedic period, where sages would fast for days and perform the puja with mantras from Rigveda. It is believed that Chhath Puja was also performed by Karna, the son of Lord Surya and the King of Anga. It is therefore celebrated in every region of Bihar with full enthusiasm and is termed as Mahaparv for Biharis.It is very popular festival in the Anga region

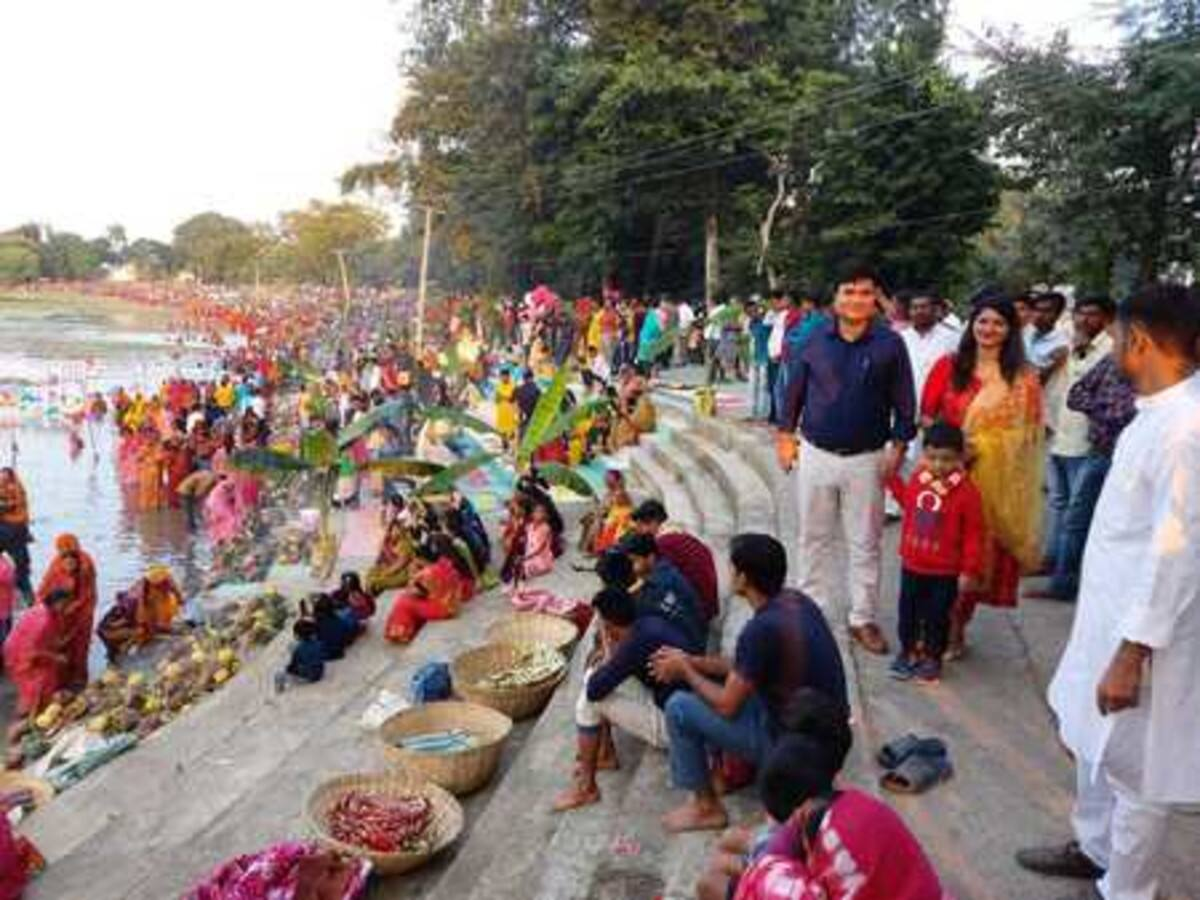
Chhath Celebration in Narayanpur, Bhagalpur

- Karma-Dharma puja

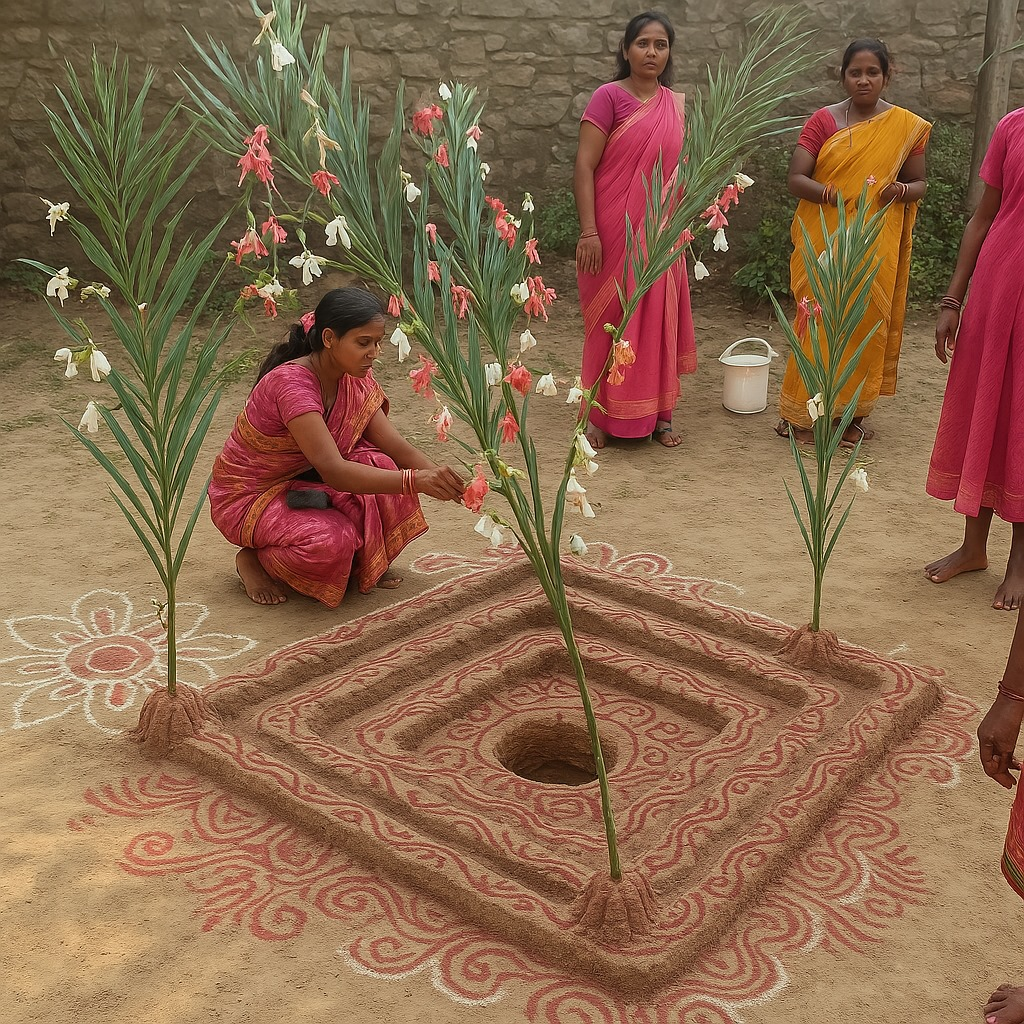
Glimpse of Karma-Dharma puja

Karma-dharma (Karma) Puja is an important Indian festival, primarily celebrated in the states of Jharkhand, Bihar, Assam, Madhya Pradesh, Chhattisgarh, West Bengal, and some other regions. This festival is grandly observed every year on the Ekadashi of the Shukla Paksha in the month of Bhadra. Karma Puja holds special significance in strengthening the bond of love and affection between brothers and sisters. On this day, people perform special prayers and rituals to strengthen family relationships. Karma and Dharma are the principal deities of this festival, and on this day, people express their devotion and faith towards them.

=== Angika cuisine ===
Angika cuisine is predominantly consumed in the Anga region, and is characterised by the use of mustard oil, fish, and bamboo shoots. The famous Bihari Fish Curry, Sarse Baingan (a mustard preparation of eggplant), are beloved Angika delicacies. Other Angika cuisines are Ghugni-Mudi, Thekua.

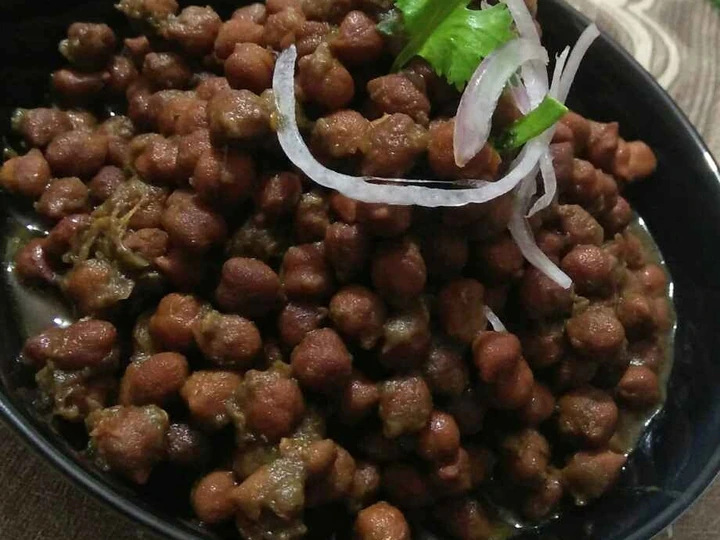
Bihari Style Ghughni which is served with Mudi

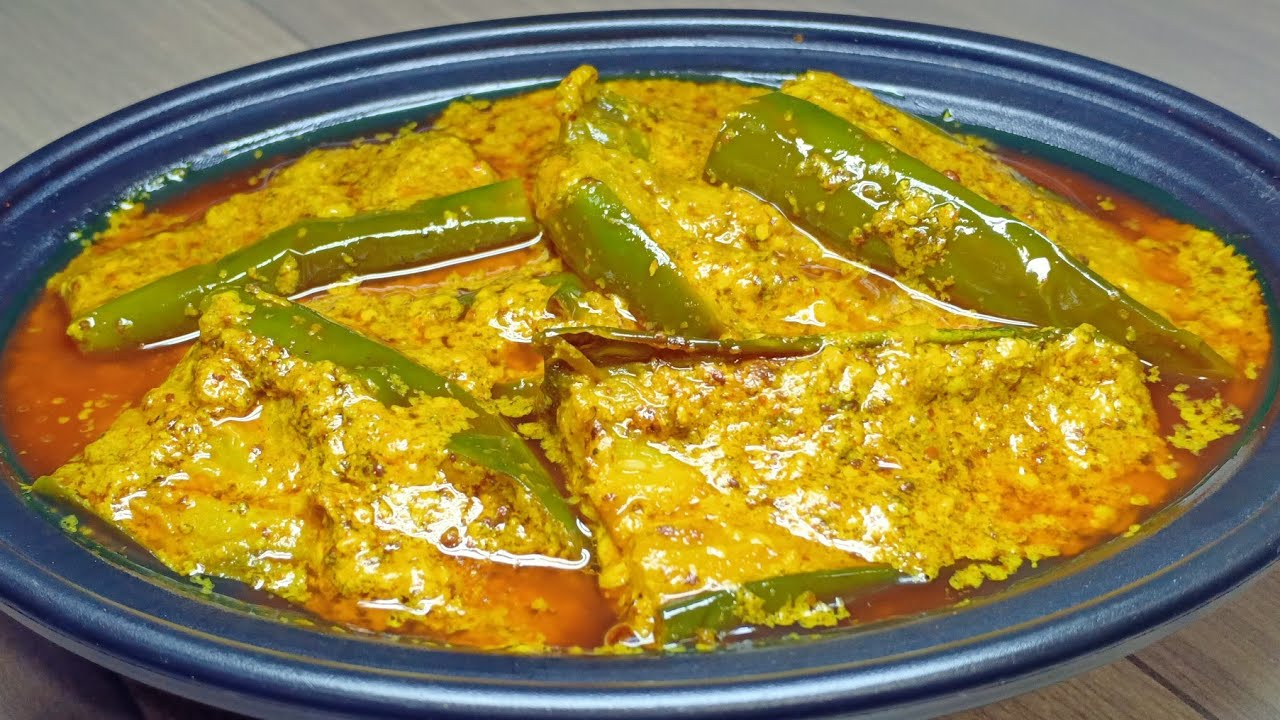
Sarsebaigan (a unique delicious spicy Angika Cuisine of Mustard and Eggplant)

=== Manjusha Art ===
Manjusha Art is an Indian art form. They are temple-shaped boxes comprising eight pillars. They are made of bamboo, jute, and paper. They also contain paintings of Hindu gods and goddesses and other characters. These boxes are used in Bishahari puja, a festival dedicated to Goddess Bishari that is celebrated in Bhagalpur, Munger and entire Anga Region of Bihar, India.

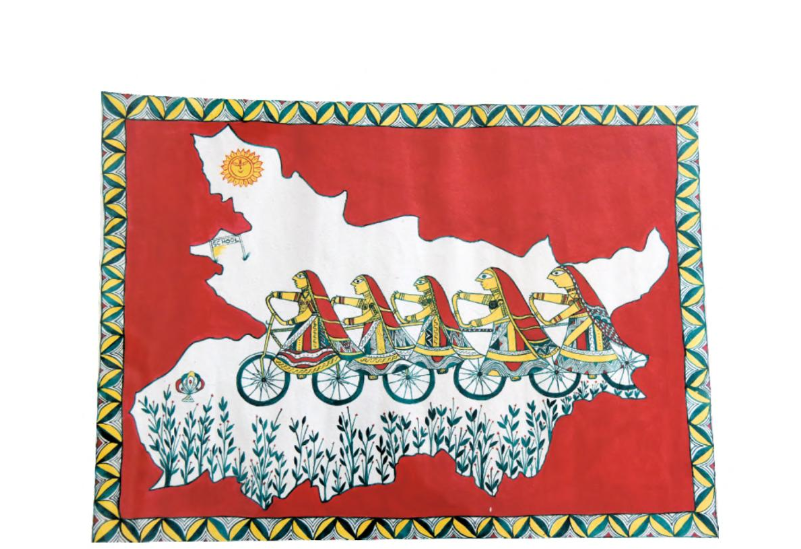
Manjusha Painting (Map of Bihar in the Manjusha Painting portraying a great message)

=== Music and drama ===
Angika Folk Song performance during Ang Mahotsav in Anga Region

Music and drama plays a crucial role in Ang Culture, although it is not so famous but is a daily part of lifestyle in Anga Region. There is also a Music Industry and film industry Angika Music Industry and Angika Film Industry which provides regional music and films based on good story-lines. Sharda Sinha, a famous folk singer of Bihar has covered more than 1500 songs in all Bihari languages including Angika. During The 2023 Shravani Mela visit in Sultanganj. Ang Mahotsav, a cultural festival of Music and Drama is held every year in The Anga Region and is a good platform to promote Angika.

=== Angika literature ===
Anil Chandra Thakur, a renowned Angika poet from the Kosi region of Bihar, gained prominence in the 1990s, celebrated for his acclaimed work, Kach.

Kinship Terms

Angika has a rich set of kinship terms. Here are some common ones:

S. No.	Kinship Term (Angika)	Pronunciation (IPA)	Meaning (English)
1	बाप / बाबा	/baːp/ /baːbu/	Father
2	माई / मों	/maːi/ /mõ/	Mother
3	दादा	/daːdaː/	Elder Brother
4	भैया / भाय	/bʱɛːjaː/ /ʧʰoʈkaː/	Younger Brother
5	दीदी	/diːdiː/	Elder Sister
6	बहीन/ बहनी	/bɛɦiniyaː/	Younger Sister
7	बाबा/ददा	/baːbaː/	Paternal Grandfather
8	दादी	/daːdiː/	Paternal Grandmother
9	नाना	/naːnaː/	Maternal Grandfather
10	नानी	/naːniː/	Maternal Grandmother
11	चाचा	/ʧaːʧaː/	Uncle (Father’s younger brother)
12	काका	/kaːkaː/	Uncle (Father’s elder brother)
13	काकी	/ʧaːʧiː/	Aunt (Father’s brother’s wife)
14	मामा	/maːmaː/	Uncle (Mother’s brother)
15	मौसी	/maʊsiː/	Aunt (Mother’s sister)
16	मौसा	/maʊsaː/	Uncle (Mother’s sister’s husband)
17	ससुर	/sʌsʊr/	Father-in-law
18	सास	/saːs/	Mother-in-law
19	बेटा	/beːʈaː/	Son
20	बेटी	/beːʈiː/	Daughter
21	देओर	/deːʋʌr/	Brother-in-law (Husband’s brother)
22	साला/सारौ	/saːlaː/	Brother-in-law (Wife’s brother)
23	ननद	/nʌnʌd/	Sister-in-law (Husband’s sister)
24	साली	/saːliː/	Sister-in-law (Wife’s sister)

== Bibliography ==
- Masica, Colin P. (1993). The Indo-Aryan Languages. Cambridge University Press. ISBN 978-0-521-29944-2.
- Grierson, George A. (1903). Linguistic Survey of India. Vol. V, Part 2, Indo-Aryan family. Eastern group. Specimens of the Bihārī and Oriyā languages. Calcutta: Office of the Superintendent of Government Printing, India. pp. 13, 95.
- Kathleen Kuiper, ed. (2010). The Culture of India. Rosen. ISBN 978-1-61530-149-2.
- Manish Kumar Thakur (2002). "The politics of minority languages: Some reflections on the Maithili language movement" (PDF). Journal of Social and Economic Development. 4 (2): 199–212.
- Mithilesh Kumar Jha (2017). Language Politics and Public Sphere in North India: Making of the Maithili Movement. Oxford University Press India. ISBN 978-0-19-909172-0.
- "An Crúbadán - Angika ( anp )". crubadan.org. Archived from the original on 25 July 2020.
- "Angika Dictionary". SIL International. 8 May 2020.
