= Ashokdham Temple =

Hindu temple in India

Ashokdham Mandir, Lakhisarai
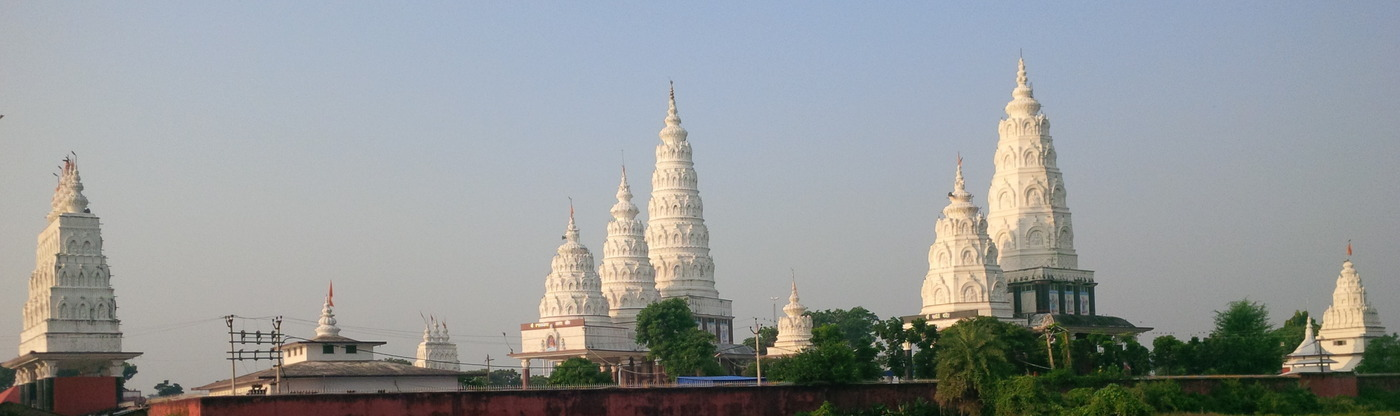
- View of Ashokdham Temple at Lakhisarai.

- Location within Bihar Location within India Location within Asia

Religion
- Affiliation: Hinduism
- District: Lakhisarai
- Deity: Shiva
- Festival: Maha Shivaratri
- Governing body: Shree Indradamneshwar Mahadev Trust

Location
- Location: Balgudar Village
- State: Bihar
- Country: India
- Coordinates: 25°11′35.7″N 86°04′23.9″E

Architecture
- Type: Hindu Architecture
- Creator: King Indradyumna
- Established: 12th century
- Temple: 4

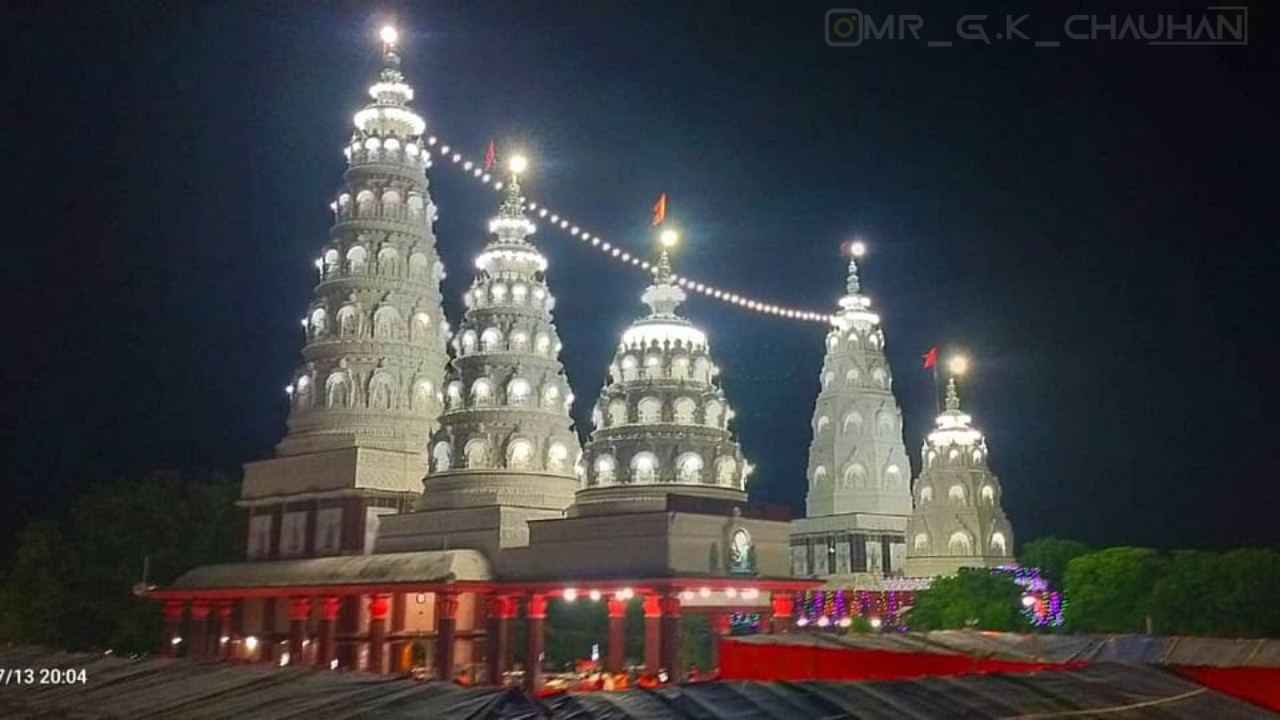
Ashokdham Lakhisarai

Ashokdham Mandir, also known as Indradamneshwar Mahadev Mandir, is located at Ashok Dham Rajauna Chouki in Lakhisarai district, Bihar. It is a temple complex: Indradamneshwar Mahadev Mandir (dedicated to the primary deity Shiva) is located in the center, surrounded by three more temples (dedicated to the goddess Parvati, the mount of the Shiva Nandi and the goddess Durga). On 11 February 1993, the Shankaracharya of Jagannathpuri inaugurated the reconstruction of the temple complex.

== History ==
It is said that this place has been a center of worship since the 8th century. Narayan Pal, the 6th emperor of Pala Empire initiated the regular worship of the Shivlingam in the 8th century. In the 12th century, a temple was built on this place by King Indradyumna. It is said that the temple was demolished and for many years there were no remains above ground.

On 7 April 1977, two boys named Ashok and Gajanand were discovered the Giant Shivlingam beneath the ground while playing a traditional Gilli-danda game. On 11 February 1993, the Shankaracharya of Jagannathpuri inaugurated the restructure of the temple complex. The current temple complex building started on 15 November 2002 under Shree Indradamneshwar Mahadev Mandir Trust.

== Maha Shivrati ==
Every year on the day of Maha Shivratri millions of pilgrims from various parts of India visit this shrine and offer sacred water of Ganges to the deity. For stay here a dharmshala (guesthouse) is built where pilgrims stays after the long journey.

== Gallery ==
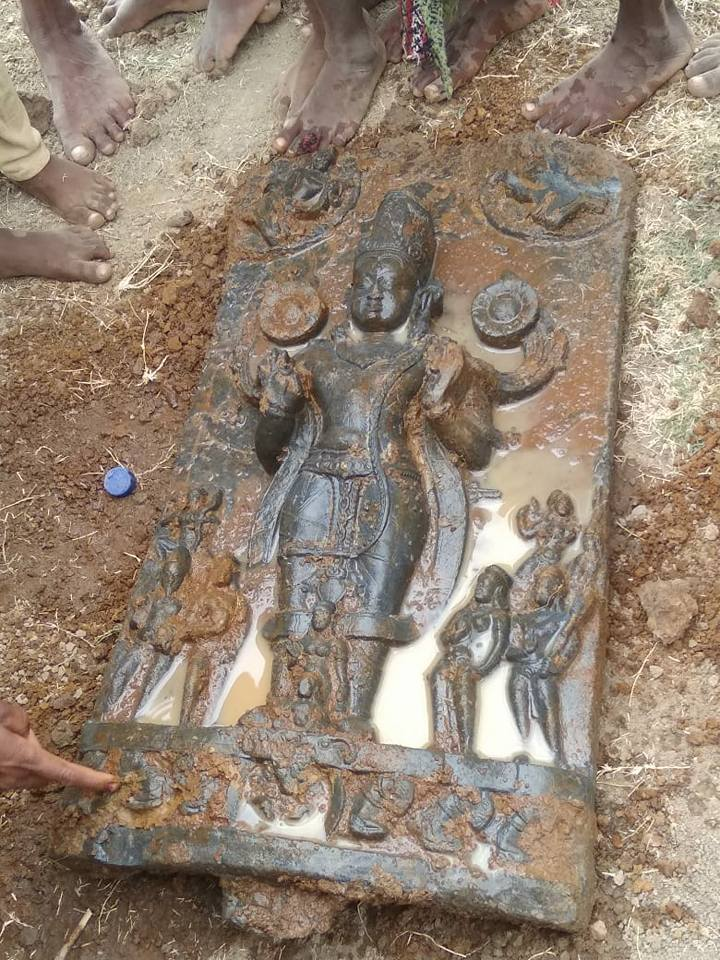
Lord Vishnu, Ashokdham (found in a pond during a minor digging work in June 2018)

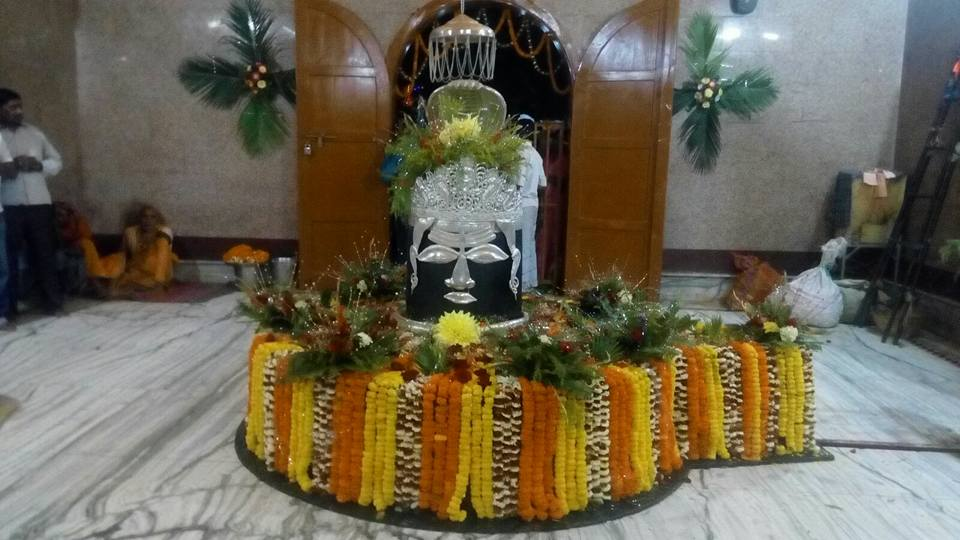
Lord Shiva, Ashokdham

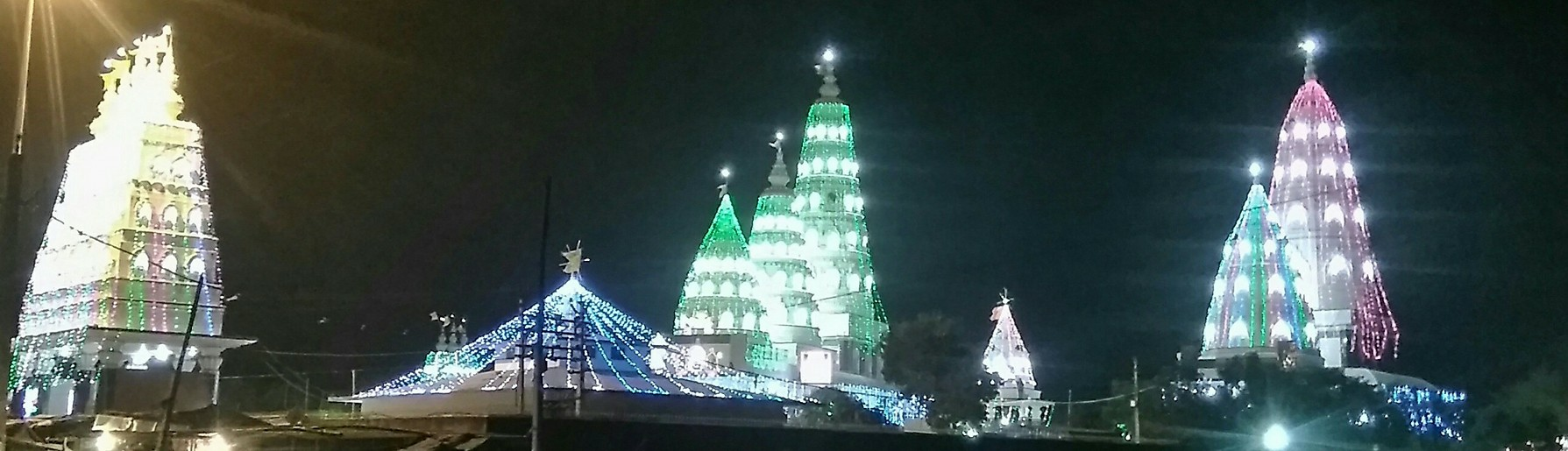
Mahashivratri celebration, Ashokdham

== See also ==
- Ariari
- Balgudar
- Barahiya
- Beldariya
- Nand Nama
- Ramgarh Chowk
- Sheikhpura
- Sheikhpura
- Surajgarha
