= Jhajha =

- City
- Nickname: Railnagri
- Location in Bihar, India
- Coordinates: 24.767°N 86.376°E
- Country: India
- State: Bihar
- Division: Munger
- District: Jamui

Government
  - Body: Jhajha Nagar Parishad

Area
  - City: 86 km^{2} (33 sq mi)
  - Urban: 64 km^{2} (25 sq mi)
  - Rank: 23
- Elevation: 122 m (400 ft)

Population (2011)
  - City: 40,646
  - Rank: 32
  - Density: 470/km^{2} (1,200/sq mi)

Languages
  - Official: Hindi
- Time zone: UTC+5:30 (IST)
- PIN: 811308
- Telephone code: 06349
- Vehicle registration: BR46
- Sex ratio: 899/1000(2011) ♀/♂
- Lok Sabha constituency: Jamui
- Vidhan Sabha constituency: Jhajha
- Website: http://www.nagarparishadjhajha.in

Jhajha is a city and a notified area in the Jamui district of Bihar, India. It is located in the southern part of Bihar, close to the Bihar–Jharkhand border. Jhajha lies on the Howrah–Mughalsarai main railway line, approximately midway between Madhupur Junction and Kiul Junction.

== Demographics ==
As of the 2011 Indian census, Jhajha city has 7,223 houses with a population of 40,646 of which 21,406 are males while 19,240 are females as of 2011. The population of children with ages 0–6 is 5,736 which is 14.11% of the total population of Jhajha town. In Jhajha, the female sex ratio is of 899 against state average of 918. Moreover, the child sex ratio is around 954 compared to the Bihar the state average 935. The literacy rate of Jhajha City is 79.13% higher than the state average of 61.80%. In Jhajha, male literacy is around 87.37% while the female literacy rate is 69.87%. Schedule Caste constitutes 13.65% while Schedule Tribe was 0.98% of the total population in Jhajha city. Out of the total population, 13,785 were engaged in work or business activity. Of this 9,971 were males while 3,814 were females. In the census survey, a worker is defined as a person who does business, job, service, and cultivator and labour activity. Of total 13,785 working population, 76.71% were engaged in Main Work while 23.29% of total workers were engaged in Marginal Work.

== Economy ==
Jhajha is a basic level business place. It has become a huge marketplace with millions of daily transactions. The main contributions to its business are made through the sale of grains, Manihari goods, food products, cloth, jewelry, and metals.

=== Banks ===
1. State Bank of India
2. Bank of India
3. Bandhan Bank
4. Canara Bank
5. Dakshin Bihar Gramin Bank
6. HDFC Bank
7. ICICI Bank
8. UCO Bank
9. RBL Bank
10. Utkarsh Small Finance Bank

== Education ==
Jhajha has a limited number of schools affiliated with national education boards.

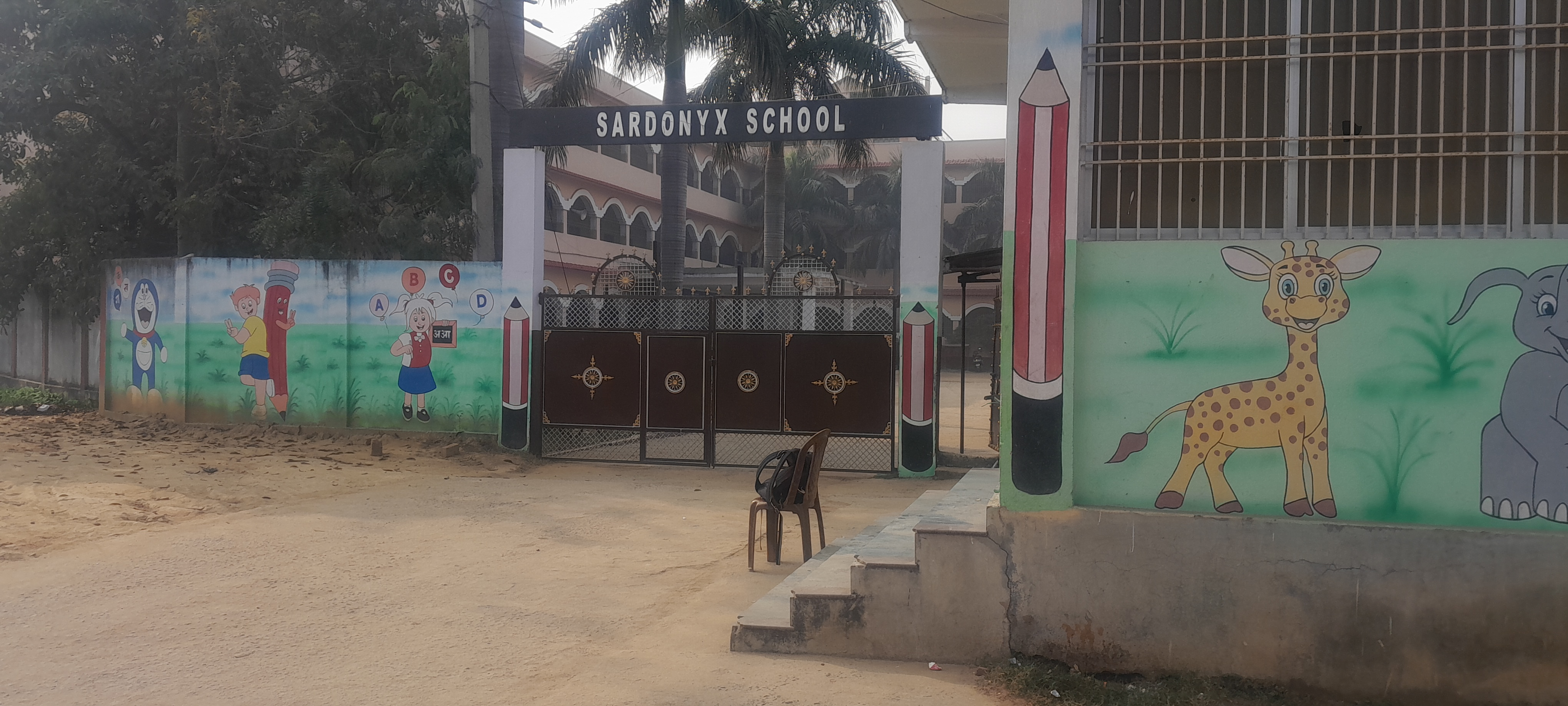
Image of the Sardonyx School

School Name	Board	Level
Dev Sundari Memorial College, Jhajha	Govt	College
St. Joseph’s School, Jhajha	CISCE	Up to Matriculation
Sardonyx School, Jhajha	CBSE	Senior Secondary (+2)
Mahatma Gandhi Samarak High School, Jhajha	Bihar	Senior Secondary (+2)
Kendriya Vidyalaya, Jhajha	CBSE	Senior Secondary (+2)
Welham Champs' School, Jhajha	CBSE	Up to Matriculation

== Transport ==
Jhajha has a large connection of railway to major cities of India. Jhajha railway station is endowed with beautiful sceneries due to the green mountains nearby. Jhajha station is the southern end of Danapur Division of East Central Railway of Indian railway situated in Asansol–Patna section of Delhi-Howrah main line. It also has good connection by roadways to nearby cities through NH-333A and SH-18. It has two bus stands from where buses and auto are available for nearby places like Gidhaur, Khuriparas, Sono, Borba, Belhar etc. Small vehicles are available for travelling to nearby villages.

== Flora and fauna ==
Nagi Dam and Nakti Dam Bird Sanctuary Site description: The Nagi Dam (791 ha) and Nakti Dam (332 ha) are two sanctuaries so close to each other that they can be taken as one bird area. Nagi is 7 km from Jhajha in the Jamui District, and Nakti is a further 4 km from Nagi, occupying similar habitat. These notified sanctuaries are surrounded by rocky hillocks, formed by the damming of streams. Both these waterbodies are quite deep, with a clear water surface. These dams were built to supply water to local farms. There are cultivable lands adjacent to both the waterbodies. Other than wildlife sanctuary, Jhajha has a many hill around the eastern side of the city famous for trekking in the winter season and towards the southern part of the city lies Batia Forest.

=== Biodiversity ===
Birds: About 1,600 bar-headed geese (Anser indicus) have been recorded from this site. According to Wetlands International (2002), 1% threshold of this species is 560; accordingly about 3% of the population is found at this IBA site. This site could also attract more than 20,000 birds, if fishing and other disturbances are curtailed during winter when most of the migrants are found in India. Beyond the cultivated areas, these waterbodies are surrounded by barren, rocky terrain. Consequently, dryland birds are also seen, such as the Indian courser Cursorius coromandelicus, chestnut-bellied sandgrouse (Pterocles exustus), yellow-wattled lapwing (Vanellus malabaricus) and Indian robin (Saxicoloides fulicata). The site falls in Biome-12, i.e. Indo-Gangetic plains, but species of Biome-11 are also sighted.

== Nearest airports ==
- Deoghar International Airport, Deoghar (57 km).
- Gaya Airport, Gaya (174 km)
- Lok Nayak Jayaprakash Airport, Patna (199 km)
- Kazi Nazrul Islam Airport, Andal, Durgapur (235 km)
- Birsa Munda Airport, Ranchi (367 km)
- Netaji Subhas Chandra Bose International Airport, Kolkata (386 km)
