= Surajgarha =

- city
- Location in Bihar, India Surajgarha (India)
- Coordinates: 25.25°N 86.23°E
- Country: India
- State: Bihar
- District: Lakhisarai
- Elevation: 104 m (341 ft)

Population (2011)
  - Total: 290,998

Languages
  - Official: Angika, Hindi, English, Urdu
- Time zone: UTC+5:30 (IST)
- PIN: 811106
- ISO 3166 code: IN-BR
- Website: www.surajgarha.in

Surajgarha is one of seven blocks in Lakhisarai district of Bihar consisting of 117 villages. It lies on the banks of the Ganges River and is 17 km north-east of Lakhisarai.

Kajra Railway Station is the nearest major railhead. This is a small town located 32 km from Munger and 16 km from Lakhisarai, on NH-33.

== Weather ==
The weather here is of extreme type. Summer temperature stays at 40-45 C in day and Winters may see a drop till 5C. Heavy downpour is also experienced. The annual rainfall is 130 cm mainly in monsoons and winters due to Western Disturbances.

Climate data for Surajgarha
Month	Jan	Feb	Mar	Apr	May	Jun	Jul	Aug	Sep	Oct	Nov	Dec	Year
Mean daily maximum °C (°F)	23.3 (73.9)	26.5 (79.7)	32.6 (90.7)	37.7 (99.9)	38.9 (102.0)	36.7 (98.1)	33.0 (91.4)	32.4 (90.3)	32.3 (90.1)	31.5 (88.7)	28.8 (83.8)	24.7 (76.5)	31.9 (89.4)
Mean daily minimum °C (°F)	9.2 (48.6)	11.6 (52.9)	16.4 (61.5)	22.3 (72.1)	25.2 (77.4)	26.7 (80.1)	26.2 (79.2)	26.1 (79.0)	25.4 (77.7)	21.8 (71.2)	14.7 (58.5)	9.9 (49.8)	20.8 (69.4)
Average rainfall mm (inches)	18.9 (0.74)	10.7 (0.42)	11.4 (0.45)	7.6 (0.30)	33.3 (1.31)	134.2 (5.28)	305.8 (12.04)	274.4 (10.80)	226.9 (8.93)	93.8 (3.69)	8.9 (0.35)	4.1 (0.16)	1,003.4 (39.50)
Source 1: BBC Weather
Source 2: IMD

== See also ==
- Balgudar
- Bhaluee
- Maheshpur
- Nijai
- Pokhrama
- Sabikpur
- Siswan
- singarpur
