= Jaitpur =

- Village
- Location in Bihar, India
- Coordinates: 25.2608°N 86.0262°E
- Country: India
- State: Bihar
- Division: Munger
- District: Lakhisarai
- Time zone: UTC+5:30 (IST)
- ISO 3166 code: IN-BR

Jaitpur is a village and a Gram panchayat under Barahiya Tehsil in Lakhisarai district of Bihar, India.
