= Nandnama =

Village in Lakhisarai, Bihar, India

Coordinates: 25.1678°N 86.0944°E

Nandnama or Nand Nama is a village in the Ramgarh Chowk Block of the Lakhisarai district in the Indian state of Bihar. It is 14 km south of the administrative district headquarters in Lakhisarai and 134 km from the state capital, Patna. It currently has a population of 15,000 and is connected to nearby areas by road and railway. It includes several schools, colleges and other educational institutions.

Nandnama 's nearest village

Ramgarh Chowk (6 km), Tetarhat (8 km), Beldariya (10 km), Kaindi (12 km), Jhulauna Chowk (9 km)

== Economy ==
Agriculture is the main occupation, with a majority of the population engaged in cultivating crops such as rice, wheat, onions and mangoes.

== Festivals ==
People living in Nand Nama celebrate various religious and social events. Some of them are among the non-religious festivals that celebrate regional culture. Many local festivals celebrate the locals' lifestyle, such as those related to the change of seasons and the harvest. The most prominent fairs and festivals include the Chhath Fasting, Durga Puja, Makar Sankranti, Nag Panchami, Holi, Eid and Muharram.

== Transport ==
- Kiul Junction
- Lakhisarai Junction
- National Highway 80
- Lok Nayak Jayaprakash Airport, Patna, around 125 km
