= Sono, Bihar =

Sono सोनो
- Block
- Location in Bihar, India
- Coordinates: 24°44′15″N 86°18′6″E
- Country: India
- State: Bihar
- Region: Mithila
- Division: Munger
- District: Jamui

Area
  - Total: 392.27 km^{2} (151.46 sq mi)
- Elevation: 106 m (348 ft)

Population
  - Total: 210,445
  - Density: 536.48/km^{2} (1,389.5/sq mi)

Languages
  - Official: Maithili, Hindi
- Time zone: UTC+5:30 (IST)
- PIN: 811314
- Telephone code: 06349
- Vehicle registration: BR-46
- Sex ratio: 867/1000(2011) ♂/♀
- Lok Sabha constituency: Jamui
- Vidhan Sabha constituency: Chakai
- Website: Block

Sono is a 'tehsil'/block (administrative Block) in the Jamui district of the Indian state of Bihar. It lies in the southern part of Bihar very close to the Jharkhand border. Sono block is divided into 19 Gram panchayats.

== Demographics ==
According to 2011 census, population of Sono block is 210455. The Tola Sono village has 1,833 families with population of 9,932 of which 5,321 are males while 4,611 are females as per Population Census 201. In Tola Sono village the population of children with age 0-6 is 1,607 which makes up 16.18% of total population of village. Average Sex Ratio of Tola Sono village is 867 which is lower than Bihar state average of 918. Child Sex Ratio for the Tola Sono as per census is 902, lower than Bihar average of 935. In 2011, the literacy rate of Tola Sono village was 75.81% compared to 61.80% in Bihar. The male literacy stands at 84.67% while the female literacy rate was 65.50%.

== Economy ==
Sono is a popular business place. It has become a marketplace with millions of daily transactions. The main contributions to its business are made through the sale of grains, Manihari goods, food products, cloth, and metals.

=== Banks ===
- Bank of India
- Uco Bank
- Dakshin Bihar Gramin Bank
- Utkarsh Small Finance Bank

== Nearby towns ==
- Khaira (11.6 km)
- Jamui (17.5 km)
- Gidhaur (19.8 km)
- Jhajha (10 km)
- Chakai (21.7 km)

== Schools and colleges ==
Sono has a small number of schools, up to the higher secondary level, but it lacks graduate colleges or English-medium schools. At present there is no cbse affiliated school in sono. For this reason, students often move to nearby cities such as Jhajha, Jamui and Deoghar. Some students travel to Jhajha every day for school, and others stay in Jhajha in lodges or hostels. Some schools in Jhajha provide bus services for students in Sono, such as St. Joseph's School, Sardonyx School, and Sunflower academy.

Schools in Sono include:

- S.S.High School, Sono
- M.S. Keshofarka
- K.M.S. Sono
- Adarash M.S. Sono
- Chandra Shekhar Mahavidyalay, Sono
- Saraswati Shishu Mandir, Sono
- J.S Memorial Public School
- Oxford Public School
- St. Xavier High School
- Vivekananda Public School

== Transportation ==
Since there are no railway to Sono, the main means of transportation is roadways. It is connected to nearby cities through the Jamui-Jhajha-Chakai Road (NH 333). The nearest railway station is Jhajha Station, 13 km from Sono. Frequent auto service is available from Jhajha to Sono. Jamui is around 32 km from Sono.

There is one govt. Hospital namely swastha kendra with some qualified doctors to give medical aid

=== Airports ===
The nearest airports to Sono include:

1. Lok Nayak Jayaprakash Airport, Patna (220 km)
2. Gaya Airport, Gaya (194 km)
3. Netaji Subhas Chandra Bose International Airport, Kolkata (406 km)
4. Birsa Munda Airport, Ranchi (367 km)
5. Deoghar Airport, Deoghar (77 km). This airport is under construction.
