= Rampur Halt railway station =

Railway station in Bihar, India

Rampur Halt

General information
- Location: Rampur-Sahoor Road, Rampur, Lakhisarai district, Bihar; India
- Coordinates: 25°10′20″N 86°08′26″E
- Elevation: 50 m (160 ft)
- System: Passenger train station
- Owner: Indian Railways
- Operator: Eastern Railway zone
- Line: Sahibganj loop line
- Platforms: 2
- Tracks: 2

Construction
- Structure type: Standard (on ground station)

Other information
- Status: Active
- Station code: RMPR
- Zone(s): Eastern Railway zone
- Division(s): Malda

History
- Former names: East Indian Railway Company

Services
Preceding station	Indian Railways	Following station
Dhanauri towards Khana	Eastern Railway zone Sahibganj loop	Kiul Junction Terminus
Location

Rampur Halt railway station is a halt railway station on Sahibganj loop line under the Malda railway division of Eastern Railway zone. It is situated beside Rampur-Sahoor Road at Rampur in Lakhisarai district in the Indian state of Bihar.
