= Sabikpur, Lakhisarai =

Village of the Indian state of Bihar

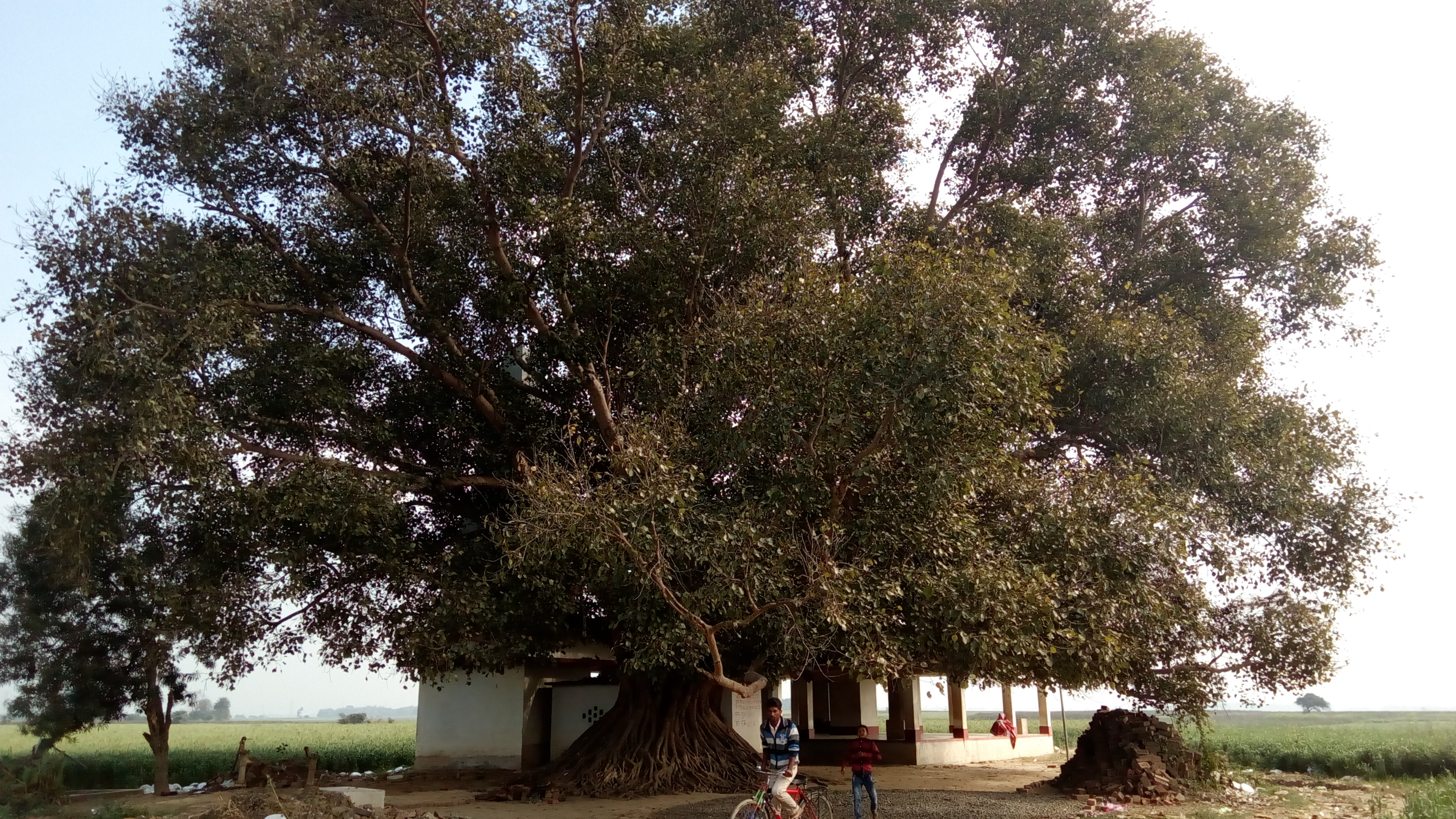
Saadh Baba Temple

Sabik Pur is a village in the Lakhisarai District of the Indian state of Bihar. Lakhisarai, Barahiya, Sheikhpura, and Jamui are the towns and cities closest to Sabikpur.

== Geography ==
Sabikpur is situated on the banks of the Harohar River, a fork of the Ganges. The river name of the river combines ‘haro' which means "to take away," and 'har,' which means "problems", since this river is reputed to "take away all problems." The river circles the village to the north, west and south. Traditionally, the village doesn't lack of water.

There are five wards in the village of Sabikpur. Lakhisarai is the nearest town, and approximately 5 km away. The village links to Lakhisarai via a solid road.

== Town ==
It is one of the oldest villages in the district.

The village is highly educated; it is home to about 50 doctors, as well as soldiers, engineers, teachers, and lawyers. The village contains 704 houses.

Around 100–150 years ago, a saint meditated at the Sadhu Baba temple and left his body there, making it a sacred place. This village also includes a temple sacred to Lord Shiva.

The village lacks signs of development, such as banks and proper healthcare services. During storms, the village has problems with electricity and transportation.

== Agriculture ==
The village has a favorable climate and geographical features, which allow farmers to grow crops like wheat, oilseeds, tomatoes, other types of vegetables, and trees like mango, neem, and bamboo. The main source of irrigation is the Harohar River which surrounds the village from three directions.
