= Dhanauri railway station =

Railway station in Bihar, India

Dhanauri

General information
- Location: Dhanauri, Lakhisarai district, Bihar; India
- Coordinates: 25°10′19″N 86°09′33″E
- Elevation: 49 m (161 ft)
- System: Passenger train station
- Owner: Indian Railways
- Operator: Eastern Railway zone
- Line: Sahibganj loop line
- Platforms: 3
- Tracks: 2

Construction
- Structure type: Standard (on ground station)

Other information
- Status: Active
- Station code: DNRE
- Zone(s): Eastern Railway zone
- Division(s): Malda

History
- Former names: East Indian Railway Company

Services
Preceding station	Indian Railways	Following station
Pawai Brohmasthan Halt towards Khana	Eastern Railway zone Sahibganj loop	Rampur Halt towards Kiul Junction
Location

Dhanauri railway station is a railway station on Sahibganj loop line under the Malda railway division of Eastern Railway zone. It is situated at Dhanauri in Lakhisarai district in the Indian state of Bihar.
