= Uren railway station =

Railway station in Bihar, India

Uren

General information
- Location: Jogpur, Urain, Lakhisarai district, Bihar; India
- Coordinates: 25°10′16″N 86°12′51″E
- Elevation: 48 m (157 ft)
- System: Passenger train station
- Owner: Indian Railways
- Operator: Eastern Railway zone
- Line: Sahibganj loop line
- Platforms: 3
- Tracks: 2

Construction
- Structure type: Standard (on ground station)

Other information
- Status: Active
- Station code: UREN
- Zone(s): Eastern Railway zone
- Division(s): Malda

History
- Former names: East Indian Railway Company

Services
Preceding station	Indian Railways	Following station
Kajra towards Khana	Eastern Railway zone Sahibganj loop	Pawai Brohmasthan Halt towards Kiul Junction
Location

Uren railway station is a railway station on Sahibganj loop line under the Malda railway division of Eastern Railway zone. It is situated at Jogpur, Urain in Lakhisarai district in the Indian state of Bihar.
