= Ghogi Bariarpur railway station =

Railway station in Bihar, India

Ghogi Bariarpur

General information
- Location: Jamalpur-Kajra Road, Kalisthan, Lakhisarai district, Bihar; India
- Coordinates: 25°12′21″N 86°18′15″E
- Elevation: 47 m (154 ft)
- System: Passenger train station
- Owner: Indian Railways
- Operator: Eastern Railway zone
- Line: Sahibganj loop line
- Platforms: 2
- Tracks: 2

Construction
- Structure type: Standard (on ground station)

Other information
- Status: Active
- Station code: GIBP
- Zone(s): Eastern Railway zone
- Division(s): Malda

History
- Former names: East Indian Railway Company

Services
Preceding station	Indian Railways	Following station
Abhaipur towards Khana	Eastern Railway zone Sahibganj loop	Kajra towards Kiul Junction
Location

Ghogi Bariarpur railway station is a railway station on Sahibganj loop line under the Malda railway division of Eastern Railway zone. It is situated beside Jamalpur-Kajra Road at Kalisthan in Lakhisarai district in the Indian state of Bihar.
