= Maheshpur, Lakhisarai district =

Maheshpur
- village
- Location in Bihar, India Maheshpur (India)
- Coordinates: 25.223°N 86.326°E
- Country: India
- State: Bihar
- District: Lakhisarai

Population (2011)
  - Total: 5,785
  - Density: 815/km^{2} (2,110/sq mi)

Languages
  - Official: Hindi
  - Additional official: Urdu
  - Regional: Angika
- Time zone: UTC+5:30 (IST)
- PIN: 811 112
- Telephone code: 91 6346-
- ISO 3166 code: IN-BR
- Nearest city: Lakhisarai
- Nearest station: Abhaipur(AHA)
- Sex ratio: 900:1000 ♂/♀
- Literacy: 65%

Maheshpur is a village in Lakhisarai district, Bihar, India. It has population of roughly 5785 people. It is located in Surajgarha block.

Maheshpur is situated between the towns of Lakhisarai and Munger, about 25 kilometres (16 mi) from each. The nearest railway station is Abhaipur, located between the major stations Kiul Junction and Jamalpur Junction. Abhaipur station is just 1 kilometre (0.62 mi) from Maheshpur. A road passing through the village connects the railway station with NH 33. Patna Airport, Deoghar Airport and Gaya Airport are the nearest airports.

The languages spoken in this village are Hindi, Angika and English. Eighty percent of the population depend on agriculture. The major crops grown are wheat, paddy, maize and mustard, along with all other major pulses and vegetables. The most celebrated festivals are Holi, Diwali, Chhath and Durga Puja.
