= Magahis =

Indo-Aryan ethnolinguistic group

मगही लोग 𑂧𑂏𑂯𑂱 𑂪𑂷𑂏
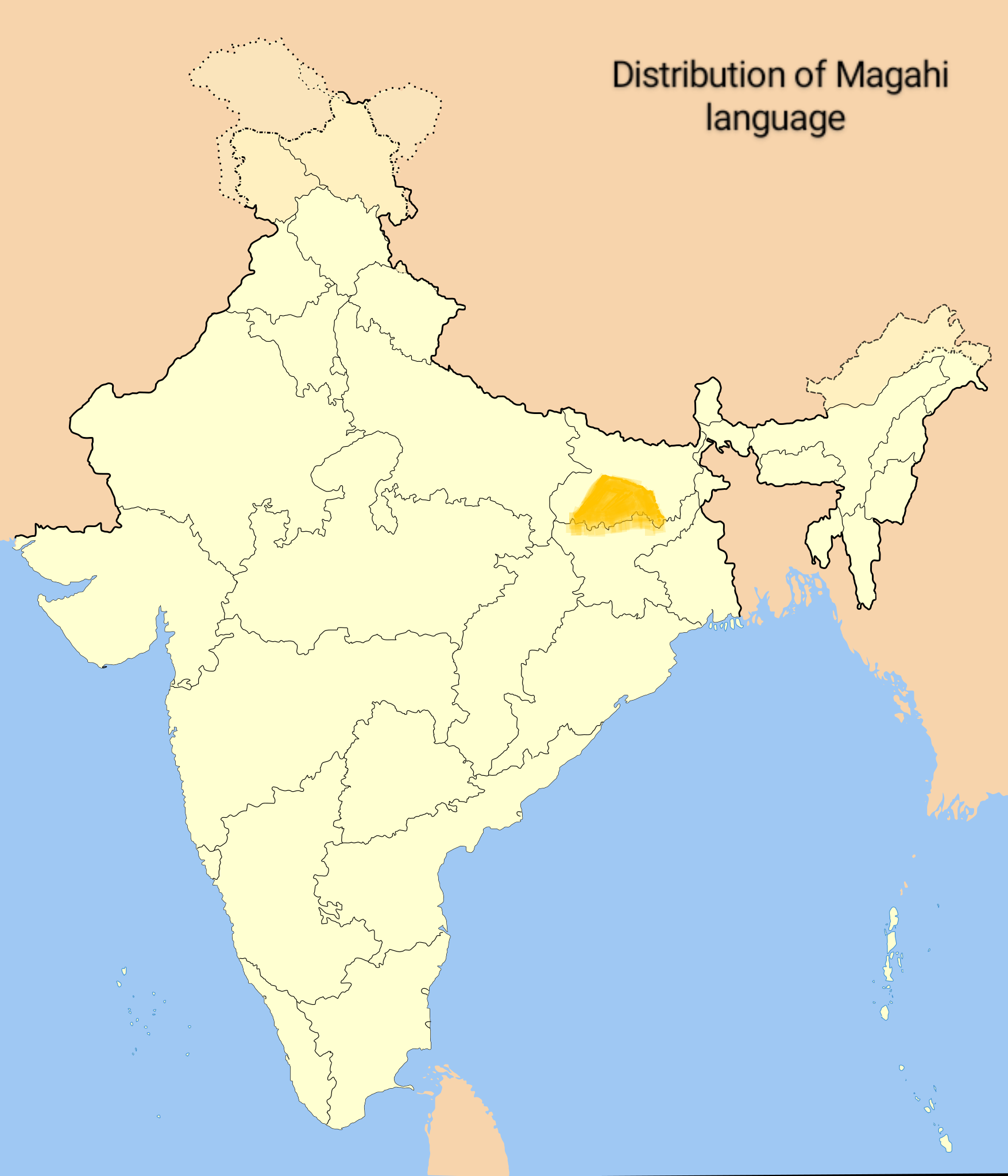

Languages
- Magahi; Additionally Hindi-Urdu

Religion
- Majority: Hinduism; Minority: Islam; Buddhism; Christianity; Jainism

Related ethnic groups
- Bhojpuris, Maithils, and other Indo-Aryan peoples

Magahis (Devanagari: मगही लोग, Kaithi: 𑂧𑂏𑂯𑂱 𑂪𑂷𑂏) are an Indo-Aryan ethnolinguistic group native to the Magadh region of the East Indian states of Bihar and Jharkhand. Magahi culture is rich with its distinct language, folk songs and festivals. They natively speak the Magahi language.

== Language ==
The Magahi language is mainly spoken in south Bihar and parts of Jharkhand. It is in the Bihari group of Indo-Aryan languages. Around 12 million people speak Magahi as a native language according to the 2011 census of India. It is spoken in eleven districts of Bihar (Gaya, Patna, Jehanabad, Aurangabad, Nalanda, Nawada, Sheikhpura, Arwal, Lakhisarai, Jamui and some parts of Banka), and in eleven districts of Jharkhand (Hazaribag, Palamu, Garhwa, Deoghar, Chatra, Koderma, Jamtara, Bokaro, Dhanbad, Giridih, Palamu).

The people of Bihar speak the Magahi dialect of Magahi and the peoples of Jharkhand speaks the Khortha dialect of Magahi.

== Religion ==
Shaktism (most prominent sect of Magadha), Saurya sect (now got completely merged with Shaktism), Shaivism (Shaivism have great significance in Magadha mainly the newly emerged movement of Shiv Charcha is growing fastly and Vaidyanath Jyotirlinga is also too much important for Magadhi peoples), While Vaishnavism is not much famous but sites like Vishnupad temple shows its influence in history.

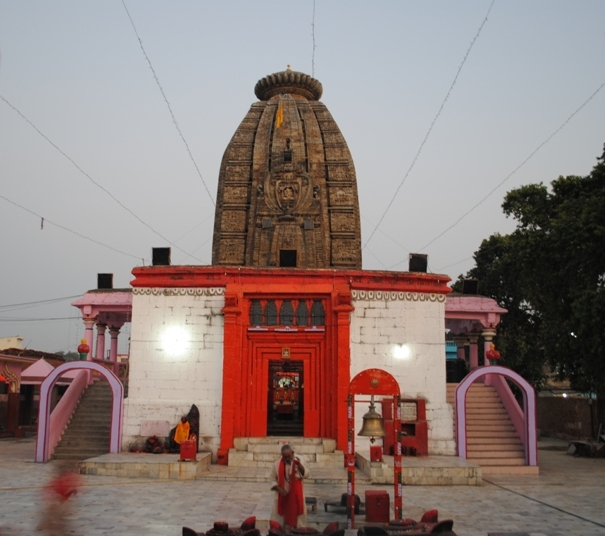
Deo Surya Mandir in Deo, Aurangabad, Bihar, India

Jainism was also born in Magadha as last Tirthankar, Mahaveer Jain were born in Magadh, and it's also believed that almost 20 Tirthankars got enlightenment in magadha (Sammed shikharji and Pavapuri).

Last and 10th guru of Sikhism, Guru Gobind Singh ji was born in Patna (Patna Sahib) that's why Magadha also have great significance in Sikhism.

Tribal beliefs are also present as many tribes like Munda, Oraon and Santhali live in high number in Magadh region of Jharkhand and also in some parts of Bihar. Even many Hindus worship pre-vedic or Tribal deities like Sokha Baba, Bir Kuar Baba, Dihvar baba etc.

== Festivals ==
Chhath is an important festival of Magadhi people. Other important festivals are Durga puja, Fagua(Holi), Sarswati puja, Teej, Jitiya, Gaiya dardh/Sohrai, Godhan Kutai, Karma Puja, Anat puja, Deepavali(kali puja), Chaiti Chhath, Jethaan puja/Tulsi vivah, Bar puja/Vat savitri vrat, Dussehra, chaiti Navami pujai, Ashin Navami Pujai, Savan satami pujai, Ganga Snan, Satuaan, Til Sakraat, Vishwakarma puja, Chaiti Navrat and Magadhi new year(Holi or Fagua), Gungi snan, Pitra Paksh, Chaiti Durga puja,

== Music and dance ==
Magahi folk singers

Jhumar, Jatsaar, Samdaun(vidai geet), Domakch/Damkach, Pachraa, Saanjh, Deepavali geet( geet sung by women on dipavali for calling prosperity in house), Chhath geet, Paraat geet, Ropani-pavariha geet(sometimes known as only "Ropani geet" Shiv Charcha, Jharni geet(sung by Muslims during Muharram) and many types of songs sung during wedding rituals like Matkod geet, Bidai geet, Bhatwaan geet, Kanyadaan geet etc. are also integral part of Magadhi culture, performed on various occasions.

Matkod geet, a Magahi wedding-canopy (mandap) song

A Magahi paddy-transplanting song (Ropani geet), sung during Sawan–Bhadon

== Cinema ==
Bhaiyaa was the first film with sound in the cinema of Bihar which was made in Magahi language and released in 1961 directed by Phani Majumdar.

Bhojpuri language cinema is the more prominent among the three main languages of Bihar with majority of the Bihari movies being made in Bhojpuri.

== Painting ==
In folk paintings Kohbar painting is most important in Magadhi culture, generally it's created on wedding. In Jharkhand (North part/Magadh) similar type of painting is famous called Sohrai-Kohbar painting it's also created during wedding and on the festival of Sohrai/Gaiya daardh. It achieved GI Tag in 2020.

Tikuli art is also a famous art of Magadh. It was originated in Patna around 800–1000 years ago. The word tikuli means "Bindi" in Magadhi(Magahi) Language. This art have themes like Radhe shyam, Shiv and Parvati ji, sometimes animals could be part of it. During mughal period Tikuli art was generally carved on mirror but now it's also created on clothes and canvas.

Sujani art was originated in bhusura village of Arwal district of Magadh region during early 18th century, which got famous in whole Magadh region of Bihar and Jharkhand with time. Originally it was created on pillow and bedsheet of newborns, that's why it's called Sujani which means "auspiciouslly born". But during 19th century it became more famous and it became a tradition that every girl have to make Sujani embroidery on Pardah or Bedsheet or on canvas oranywhere to bring it to house of in laws. Sujani art achieved GI tag in 2006

Sohrai painting is painted during Sohrai festival. As during Deepavali there is a tradition of cleaning and decorating home so, peoples of Magadh celebrates Sohrai festival next day if Deepavali and to decorate homes they make Soharai painting on walls. Its history is traced bask to 7000BCE. them paitnings like Bhim betka are comsidered its origin. It aĺso got GI tag in 2020.

Khatwa embroidery and art is an art emerged from Patna.It's carved out on tents, saree, bedsheet.

== Folk ballads ==
Magahi language contains both oral and written repertoire of folksongs and ballads, some of their subject matter also known to the northern part of India. The ballads are sung by folk singers and bards, and tend to vary between each telling. Among the more famous ballads of the Magahi repertoire, there are Song of Gopichandra and the Song of Lorik, the latter also known as Lorikayan or Lorikayana. Magahi hadson many poets like yahya maneri from patna composed dohas in magahi way before other eastern languages also badri das dharam das and many more saints composed songs and dohas in magahi also mahakavi of magahi dalshaha or raja dalel singh from ramgarh riyasat composite shivasagar contains 12,000 dohas and over 700 pages also composed many more books like raja rahsya govind lilamritam and many more.

== Notable people ==
- Shri Krishna Sinha, first Chief Minister of Bihar and freedom fighter
- Yadunandan Sharma, freedom fighter and peasants' rights activist
- Karyanand Sharma, freedom fighter
- Lalit Mohan Sharma, former Chief Justice of India
- Rajo Singh, former MP of Begusarai
- Dineshwar Sharma, former Investigation Bureau Director and Administrator of Lakshadweep
- R. N. Ravi, Governor of West Bengal
- Tarkeshwari Sinha, freedom fighter and former MP from Barh
- Samprada Singh, Billionaire and founder of Alkem Laboratories
- Ram Lakhan Singh Yadav, freedom fighter & educationist
- Anugrah Narayan Singh, freedom fighter and first Deputy Chief Minister of Bihar
- Satyendra Narayan Sinha, freedom fighter
- Nitish Kumar, longest serving Chief Minister of Bihar
- Mathura Prasad Naveen, poet
