= Barhiya railway station =

Railway station in Lakhisarai, Bihar, India

BARHIYA

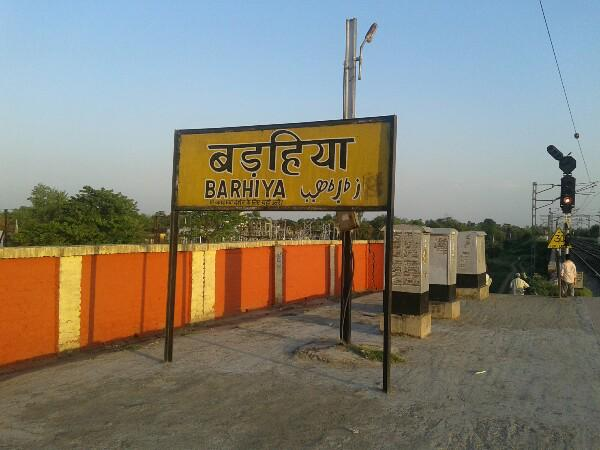
- View of the station board from one of the platforms

General information
- Location: Barahiya, Lakhisarai, Bihar; India
- Coordinates: 25°16′57″N 86°0′55″E
- Elevation: 81 metres (266 ft)
- System: Indian Railways station
- Owner: Indian Railways
- Operator: East Central Railway
- Lines: Howrah–Delhi main line Asansol–Patna section Kiul-Barauni Section
- Platforms: 3
- Tracks: 3

Construction
- Structure type: Standard (on-ground station)

Other information
- Status: Functioning
- Station code: BRYA
- Zone(s): East Central Railway
- Division(s): Danapur
- Fare zone: East Central Railway

History
- Opened: 1862
Services
Preceding station	Indian Railways	Following station
East Central Railway zone
Gangasarai Halt towards Asansol Junction or Howrah Junction	Howrah–Delhi main line Asansol–Patna section	Rampur Dumra Junction towards Patna Junction or New Delhi
Route map
Location
- Location within India Location within Bihar
- Interactive map of Barhiya

Barhiya, station code BRYA, serves the municipal city of Barahiya in the Lakhisarai district in the Indian state of Bihar. The station belongs to the Danapur railway division of East Central Railway. Barhiya is connected to metropolitan areas of India, by the Delhi–Kolkata main line via Mugalsarai–Patna route which runs along the historic Grand Trunk Road. Railways and roads are the main means of transport in the Barhiya region. Due to its location on Howrah–Patna–Mughalsarai main line, most of the Patna, Barauni-bound express trains coming from Howrah, Sealdah, Ranchi, Tatanagar, stop here. The Sahibganj loop line leaves Munger district, and enters Lakhisarai district near the Barhiya Station.

== History ==
Barhiya Station had been considered as one of the chief trade centres on the railway even in the British colonial period, due to its proximity to rivers and rail lines.

== Facilities ==
The major facilities available are waiting rooms, computerized reservation facility, reservation counter, and vehicle parking. Vehicles are allowed to enter the station premises. The station also has STD/ISD/PCO telephone booth, toilets, tea stall and book stall.

=== Platforms ===
There are three platforms in this station.

== Trains ==
Many passenger and express trains serve Barhiya station.

== Station Address ==
NH 80 (NH-33), Near Barahiya Sub Post Office, Distt.- Lakhisarai, Pin - 811302

State: Bihar

== Nearest airports ==
The nearest airports to Barhiya station are:

1. Birsa Munda Airport, Ranchi 256 kilometres (159 mi)
2. Gaya Airport 138 kilometres (86 mi)
3. Lok Nayak Jayaprakash Airport, Patna 111 kilometres (69 mi)
4. Netaji Subhash Chandra Bose International Airport, Kolkata
