= Pawai Brohmasthan Halt railway station =

Railway station in Bihar, India

Pawai Brohmasthan Halt Pawai

General information
- Location: Pawai Brohmasthan, Lakhisarai district, Bihar; India
- Coordinates: 25°10′16″N 86°11′47″E
- Elevation: 47 m (154 ft)
- System: Passenger train station
- Owner: Indian Railways
- Operator: Eastern Railway zone
- Line: Sahibganj loop line
- Platforms: 2
- Tracks: 2

Construction
- Structure type: Standard (on ground station)

Other information
- Status: Active
- Station code: PWBN
- Zone(s): Eastern Railway zone
- Division(s): Malda

History
- Former names: East Indian Railway Company

Services
Preceding station	Indian Railways	Following station
Uren towards Khana	Eastern Railway zone Sahibganj loop	Dhanauri towards Kiul Junction
Location

Pawai Brohmasthan Halt railway station is a halt railway station on Sahibganj loop line under the Malda railway division of Eastern Railway zone. It is situated at Pawai Brohmasthan in Lakhisarai district in the Indian state of Bihar.
