= Kajra railway station =

Railway station in Bihar, India

Kajra

General information
- Location: Kajra, Lakhisarai district, Bihar; India
- Coordinates: 25.182766°N 86.261571°E
- Elevation: 51 m (167 ft)
- System: Passenger train station
- Owner: Indian Railways
- Operator: Eastern Railway zone
- Line: Sahibganj loop line
- Platforms: 2
- Tracks: 4
- Connections: Platform length: 656 m

Construction
- Structure type: Standard (on ground station)
- Parking: Yes

Other information
- Status: Active
- Station code: KJH
- Zone(s): Eastern Railway zone
- Division(s): Malda

History
- Opened: 1901
- Former names: East Indian Railway Company

Services
Preceding station	Indian Railways	Following station
Ghogi Bariarpur towards Khana	Eastern Railway zone Sahibganj loop	Uren towards Kiul Junction
Location

Kajra railway station is a railway station on Sahibganj loop line under the Malda railway division of Eastern Railway zone. It is situated at Kajra in Lakhisarai district in the Indian state of Bihar. The station has two platforms with a length of approximately 656 metres.
