= Pathakchak =

Pathakchak is a village in Sikandra Block in the Jamui district of Bihar state, India. It forms a part of the Munger division. It is 12 kilometres (7.5 mi) south of Jamui, 10 kilometres (6.2 mi) from Sikandra and 157 kilometres (98 mi) from the state capital at Patna.
