= Madhubani village, Bihar =

Madhubani
- Village
- Location within Bihar
- Coordinates: 26.9990°N 84.1004°E
- Country: India
- State: Bihar
- District: West Champaran district

Government
  - Type: Panchayati raj (India)
  - Body: Gram panchayat
- Demonym: Bihari

Languages
  - Official: Hindi
- Time zone: UTC+5:30 (IST)
- Postal code: 845104
- ISO 3166 code: IN-BR
- Vehicle registration: BR-22

Madhubani is a village and block located at the cost of Gandak River in Valmiki Nagar Constituency in West Champaran district in the Indian state of Bihar. Villages lie between Dhanha Pool to Madanpur Pool are completely dependent on Uttar Pradesh's city Padrauna for Goods and Services including this village because there is no any direct connectivity for the nearest city Bagaha. Majority of the population are follow Hindu religion and else are Islam.

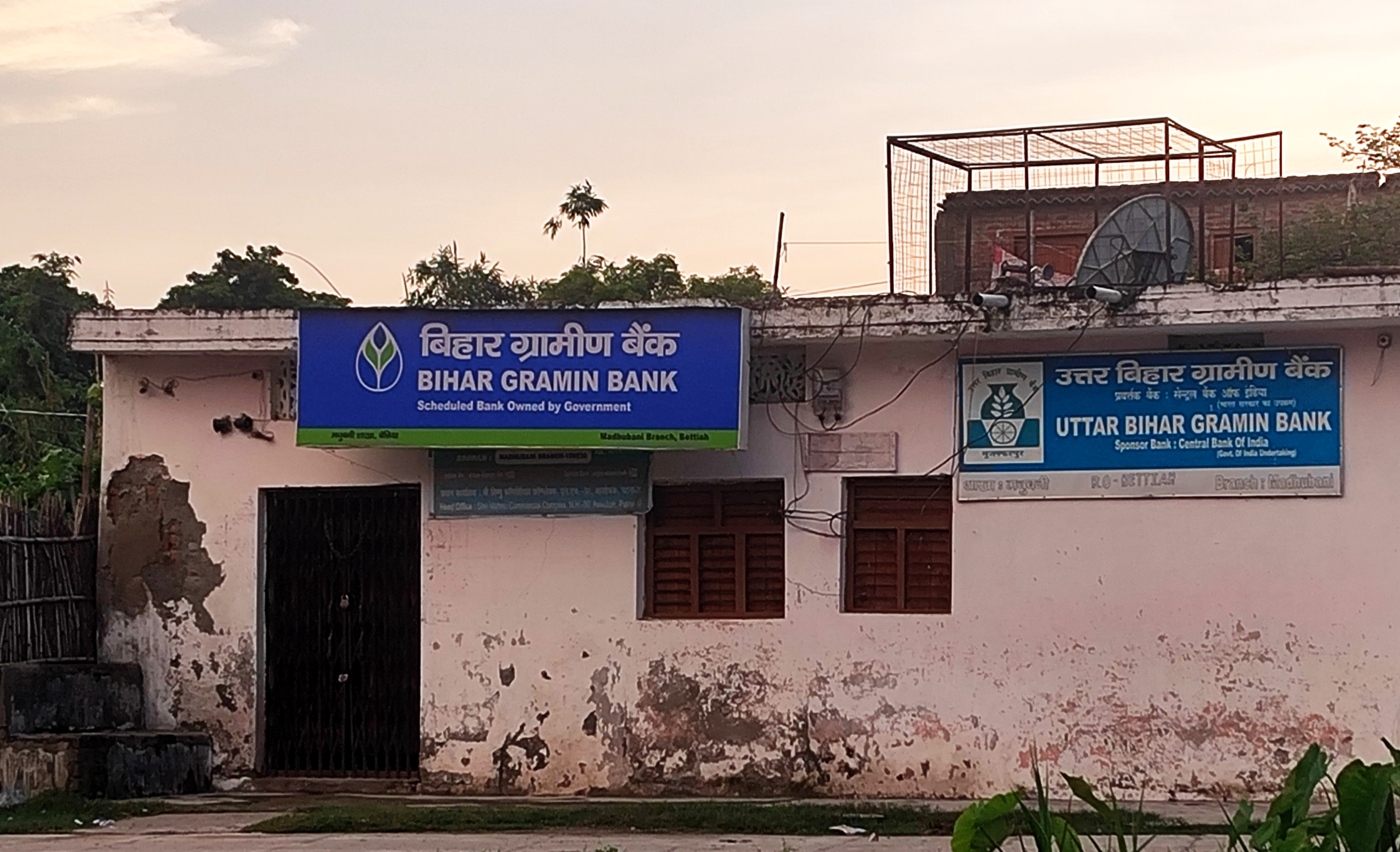
Bihar Gramin Bank

It is one of the oldest Rural Bank located in this village.

== Demographics ==
As of the 2011 census of India, Madhubani had a population of 2266 in 438 households. Males constitute 52.38% of the population and females 47.61%. Madhubani has an average literacy rate of 41.39%, lower than the national average of 74%: male literacy is 67.59%, and female literacy is 32.4%. In Madhubani, 18.4% of the population is under 6 years of age.
