= Lakhisarai Junction railway station =

Railway station in Lakhisarai, Bihar, India

LAKHISARAI JUNCTION

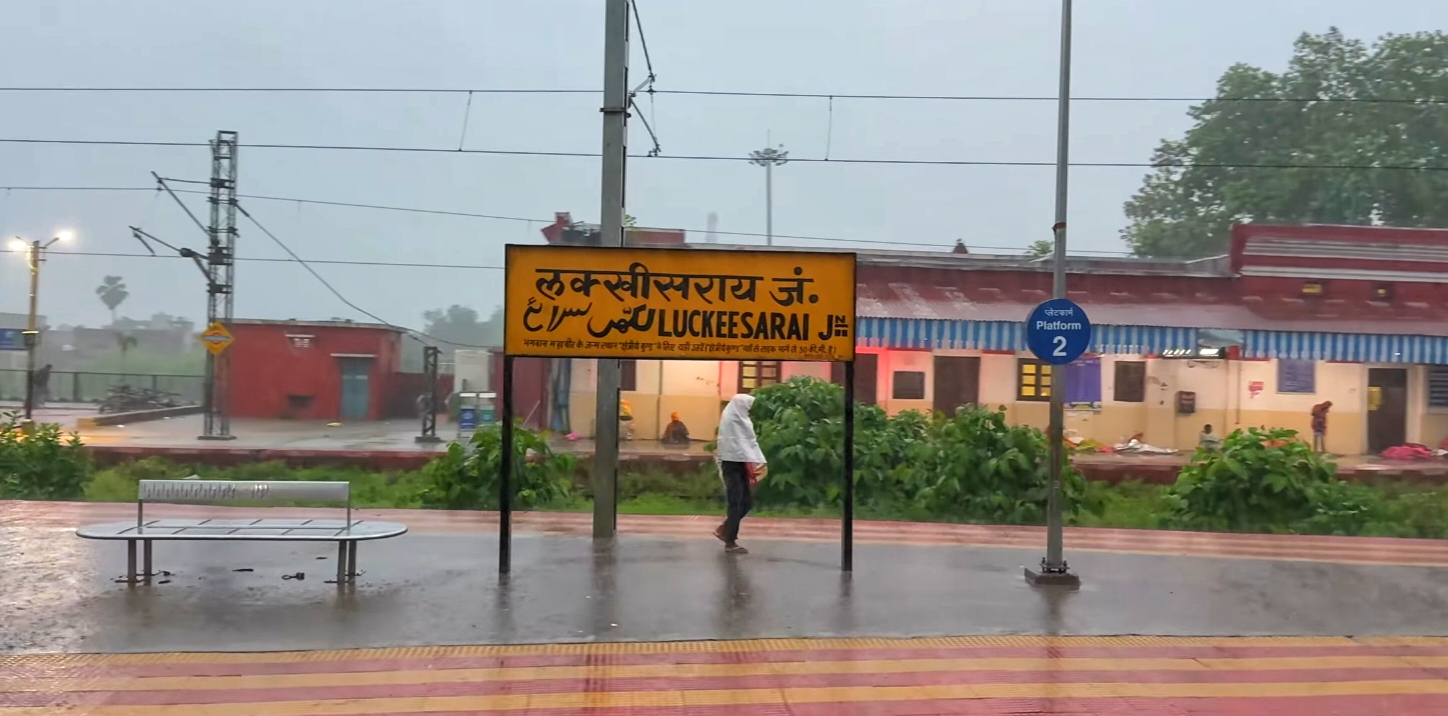
- View of the station board from two of the platforms

General information
- Location: Lakhisarai, Lakhisarai, Bihar; India
- Coordinates: 25°10′18″N 86°5′38″E
- Elevation: 53 metres (174 ft)
- System: Express train and Passenger train Station
- Owner: Indian Railways
- Operator: East Central Railway
- Lines: Howrah–New Delhi main line Asansol–Patna section Gaya–Kiul line Barauni–Luckeesarai Section
- Platforms: 5
- Tracks: 6
- Connections: Kiul Junction; Patna Junction; Barauni Junction; Gaya Junction

Construction
- Structure type: Standard (on-ground station)
- Parking: Yes

Other information
- Status: Functioning
- Station code: LKR
- Zone(s): East Central Railway zone
- Division(s): Danapur

History
- Opened: 1864; 162 years ago
- Rebuilt: No
Route map
Location
- Location within India Location within Bihar
- Interactive map of Lakhisarai Junction

Lakhisarai Junction also called Luckeesarai Junction station code LKR, is one of the major railway junctions in East Central Railway. Lakhisarai is connected to metropolitan areas of India, by the Delhi–Kolkata Main Line via Mugalsarai–Patna route which runs along the historic Grand Trunk Road.

== Line and locations ==
Lakhisarai Junction located on the bank of Kiul River serves the headquarters of Lakhisarai district in the Indian state of Bihar. Railways and roads are the main means of transport in the region. The district headquarters has the presence of Danapur division's main line along with Sahibganj loop loop line. The main line crosses the Kiul River between Kiul Junction and Lakhisarai Junction. The Kiul–Nawada–Gaya branch line also starts from the Kiul Junction near to Lakhisarai. Lakhisarai has a religious importance as it is the place where Mahavira, Tirthankara of Jainism, achieved Kevala Jnana. The Lakhisarai railway station is in Howrah–Patna–Mughalsarai main line. Most of the Patna, Barauni-bound express trains coming from Howrah, Sealdah, Ranchi, Tatanagar stop here.

== Facilities ==
The major facilities available are waiting rooms, computerized reservation facility, reservation counter, vehicle parking. The vehicles are allowed to enter the station premises. The station also has STD/ISD/PCO telephone booth, toilets, tea stall and book stall. Automatic ticket vending machines have been installed to reduce the queue for train tickets on the station.

== Platform ==
There are five platforms. The platforms are interconnected with foot overbridge.

== Connections ==
The nearest airports to Lakhisarai Station are:

1. Gaya Airport 141 kilometres (88 mi)
2. Lok Nayak Jayaprakash Airport, Patna 126 kilometres (78 mi)
3. Birsa Munda Airport, Ranchi 247 kilometres (153 mi)
4. Netaji Subhash Chandra Bose International Airport, Kolkata
