= KJH =

KJH or kjh may refer to:

- KJH, the IATA code for Kaili Huangping Airport, Guizhou, China
- KJH, the Indian Railways station code for Kajra railway station, Bihar, India
- kjh, the ISO 639-3 code for Khakas language, Russia

== See also ==
- Operation KJH, a World War II reconnaissance mission undertaken by Logan Scott-Bowden
