= Karyanand Sharma =

Indian Politician

Karyanand Sharma (1901–1965) was a nationalist and peasant leader who led movements against zamindars and the British.

== Biography ==
Karyanand Sharma was born in a Bhumihar family in the village of Sahur in Munger (British India) now in Lakhisarai district of Bihar, India. Although he started studying in 1906, he had soon to leave school and help the family in cultivation. However, between 1914 and 1920, he educated himself and matriculated in 1920 just in time to join the non-cooperation movement.

== Contribution to freedom movement and peasant movement ==
He was arrested and sentenced to one year. After release from jail, he became more and more involved in peasant issues and in 1927 organized a struggle of the tenants at Chanan against arbitrary extortions by the zamindars. This was particularly directed against the Giddhaur Raj and Kaira estate. Since these zamindars and their minions were particularly oppressive, the local Indian National Congress leaders permitted Karyanand to carry on the struggle though they themselves did not extend much help. Nevertheless, because of the unity among the tenants, the zamindars had to bow down and this victory became a great morale-booster for the peasants in Munger.

After the famous Barahiya Bakasht Andolan in 1937–39, strictures were passed against him and in 1938 he was arrested by the then Congress government. After his release from prison when he joined the Kisan Movement he was jailed again and again. During these long sojourns he got a chance to read Marxist literature and joined the Communist Party of India although, until 1943 he remained a member of the All India Congress Committee. After independence, he became one of the top leaders of the Communist Party of India and leader of its legislature party until his death. It was under the able leadership of Karyanand Sharma that the Communist Party of India waged some important agrarian struggles in the 1950s, the most notable among them being Sathi farm struggles in Champaran.
