= Pokhrama =

Pokhrama (formerly known as Pokhrawan) is a village in the Lakhisarai district of Bihar, India and a part of the Surajgarha Block Development. People across India gather in the village during Chhath Puja, a major Hindu festival. The village has one Gramin Post Office Branch under the Kajra Sub-Office.
