= Uttar Bihar Gramin Bank =

Defunct Indian regional rural bank

- Logo used from 2008 to 2025
- Native name: उत्तर बिहार ग्रामीण बैंक
- Company type: Regional Rural Bank
- Industry: Financial services
- Predecessor: Uttar Bihar Kshetriya Gramin Bank; Kosi Kshetriya Gramin Bank
- Founded: May 1, 2008; 18 years ago
- Defunct: May 1, 2025; 13 months ago
- Fate: Merged with Dakshin Bihar Gramin Bank to form Bihar Gramin Bank
- Successor: Bihar Gramin Bank
- Headquarters: Muzaffarpur, India
- Website: ubgb.in

Uttar Bihar Gramin Bank (UBGB) was an Indian regional rural bank (RRB) in the State of Bihar, India. It was under the ownership of Ministry of Finance, Government of India. It was merged in 2025 to form Bihar Gramin Bank.

== See also ==
- Banking in India
- List of banks in India
- Reserve Bank of India
- Regional Rural Bank
- Indian Financial System Code
- List of largest banks
- List of companies of India
- Make in India
