= Babhangawan =

Village in Bihar, India

Coordinates: 25°12′40″N 86°02′15″E

Babhangawan is a village in the Lakhisarai district of Bihar, India.

The village had a population of 3,737 as of the 2011 Census. The total geographical area of the village is 1,465 hectares.

== Demographics ==
According to the 2011 Census of India, Babhangawan had a population of 3,737, comprising 1,961 males and 1,776 females. The village had 677 children aged 0–6, representing 18.12% of the total population. The village's sex ratio was 906 females per 1,000 males, which is below the Bihar state average of 918. However, the child sex ratio was 945, exceeding the state average of 935.

The literacy rate of Babhangawan in 2011 was 70.46% overall, while Bihar had an average of 61.80%. Male literacy was 77.00%, while female literacy was 63.17%.

Babhangawan is governed by the Mukhiya of Amhara Panchayat, an elected representative responsible for the village's administration.
