= Pipariya, Bihar =

Pipariya Pipariya
- Community development block
- Country: India
- State: Bihar

Government
  - Type: Bihar Government
  - Body: [Bihar], India

Languages
  - Official: Maithili, Hindi
- Time zone: UTC+5:30 (IST)
- ISO 3166 code: IN-BR

Pipariya is a community development block in Lakhisarai district, Bihar, India.

== Demographics ==
As of the 2011 census, Pipariya had 8345 households and 51496 inhabitants.
