= Kiul River =

River in India

The Kiul River (Hindi: किऊल नदी) is a tributary of the Ganges. It originates in Giridih in the state of Jharkhand and flows through Lakhisarai, Sheikhpura and Jamui districts of the state of Bihar and joins the Harohar river in the Diara region.

== Course ==
The Kiul originates from the Tisri Hill Range in the Kharagdiha police station area of Giridih district. After forming the boundary of the district for a short distance it enters Jamui district through a narrow gorge near the Satpahari hill. It first flows in an easterly direction close to the southern base of the Girdheswari Hills. It turns northward at their eastern extremity and passes near the town of Jamui. Two miles south of Jamui it is joined by the Barnar, below this point it receives the Alai, a mountain stream, and near Jamui railway station it is joined by the Anjan. It then flows northeast up to Lakhisarai, passes below the railway bridge between Kiul junction and Lakhisari station, and is joined a few miles north of that place, near Rahuaghat, by the Harohar (Halahar or Harhobar), a continuation of the Sakri River. After this it turns due east and falls into the Ganges near Surajgarha. Until it meets the Harohar the Kiul has broad sandy beds and in some places is as much as half a mile wide, though it contains very little water in summer.

In the course of its run the river traverses a total length of 111 kilometres (69 mi) and drains an area of 16,580 square kilometres (6,400 sq mi).

== Tal ==
The Mokamah group of tals lies in the Kiul-Harohar river basin and extends over an area of 1,062 square kilometres (410 sq mi). It is a saucer shaped depression extending from Fatuha in the west to Lakhisarai in the east. Its width varies from 6 to 17 kilometres (4 to 11 mi). It runs close to and almost parallel to the right bank of the Ganges. The Harohar River which is the main outlet channel for the tal area flows eastward and drains into the Kiul River. The entire Tal area undergoes submergence every year during the monsoon period from June through September. At the end of the monsoon, the agricultural activities in the upper catchment of Kiul-Harohar suffer due to scarcity of irrigation water.
