= Mathura Prasad Naveen =

- Born: 14 July 1928; Barahiya, Lakhisarai, Bihar
- Died: 18 December 2011 (aged 83)
- Occupation: Poet
- Writing career
- Language: Magahi
- Genres: Poetry, Songwriter
- Notable work: Rahe Rah Anharia Katouto
- Literary movement: progressive literature movement

Mathura Prasad Naveen (1928-2011) was an Indian Magahi language poet. He was associated with progressive literature movement.

He was born in Barahiya in Lakhisarai district on 14 July 1928. He was member of the Bihar Progressive writer association. His songs have been used in various movements and rallies. His Magahi poem collection "Rahe Rah Anharia Katouto" published in 1990.
