= Nijai =

Village in Bihar, India

Nijai is a small village in Barahiya block under Lakhisarai District in the Indian state of Bihar. This village is about eight kilometres southeast of Barahiya and three kilometres from Dumri Halt on Patna Howrah section of the Indian Railways.
