= Sringri Rishi Dham =

Hindu temple in Bihar, India

Coordinates: 25°07′37″N 86°14′03″E

Shringi Rishi Dham is a Hindu temple in the Suryagraha block of Lakhisarai district of Bihar, India. Devotees come here to get their children's head shaved after their wishes are fulfilled. The mountain waterfalls and ponds here enhance the beauty. The temple premises is situated in the root of hills. There is Sita Kund, a hot water natural water spring where devotees takes divine bath. The whole area is surrounded by hills and water bodies. There is a small dam named Shringi Rishi Dam at this location for water reservoir.

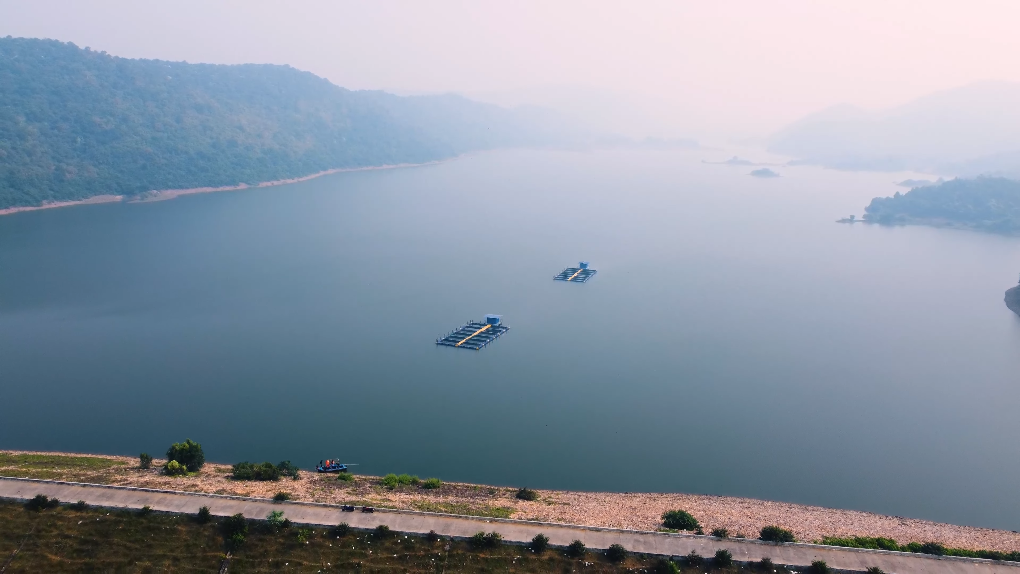
Sringri Rihsi Dam

== Mythology ==
On the advice of Guru Vashishtha, King Dasharath had the tonsure ceremony of his four sons Rama, Bharata, Laxman and Shatrughna performed at the ashram of Rishi Singh.
