= Bhaluee =

Village in Bihar, India

Bhaluee (also known as Bhalui) is a village in Lakhisarai district, Bihar, India.
