= Baghaur =

Baghaur baghaur(aujla)
- village
- Location in Punjab, India Baghaur (India)
- Coordinates: 30°40′33″N 76°11′44″E
- Country: India
- State: Punjab
- District: Ludhiana

Population (2010)
  - Total: 865

Languages
  - Official: Punjabi
  - Sikhs Regional: Punjabi
- Time zone: UTC+5:30 (IST)
- PIN: 141401

Baghaur is a village located in Khanna tehsil, in the Ludhiana district of Punjab, India. The total population of the village is about 865.

"work profile"

In Baghaur village out of total population, 401 were engaged in work activities. 96.01 % of workers describe their work as Main Work (Employment or Earning more than 6 Months) while 3.99 % were involved in Marginal activity providing livelihood for less than 6 months. Of 401 workers engaged in Main Work, 69 were cultivators (owner or co-owner) while 148 were agriculture helpers

Baghaur - Village Overview
Gram Panchayat :	Bhaghaur
Block / Tehsil :	Khanna
District :	Ludhiana
State :	Punjab
Pincode :	141401
Area :	189 hectares
Population :	865
Households :	194
Nearest Town :	Khanna
