= Balgudar =

Village in Bihar, India

- Village
- Interactive map of Balgudar
- Coordinates: 25°16′0″N 76°8′0″E
- Country: India
- State: Bihar
- District: Lakhisarai

Population
  - Total: 7,326
- Postal code: 811311

Balgudar is a village in the Lakhisarai District of Bihar, India, with a total 1200 families residing. The total population of the village is 7,326, of which 3654 are males while 3672 are females. The Child Sex Ratio for the Balgudar as per census is 1044, higher than Bihar average of 935. Balgudar village has a lower literacy rate compared to Bihar. In 2011, the literacy rate of Balgudar village was 59.13 % compared to 61.80% of Bihar. In Balgudar male literacy stands at 67.34% while female literacy rate was 50.89%.

The total working population is 41.11% of the total population, including 61.23% of the men and 19.57% of the women.
