= Lakhisarai =

- Town
- Lakhisarai
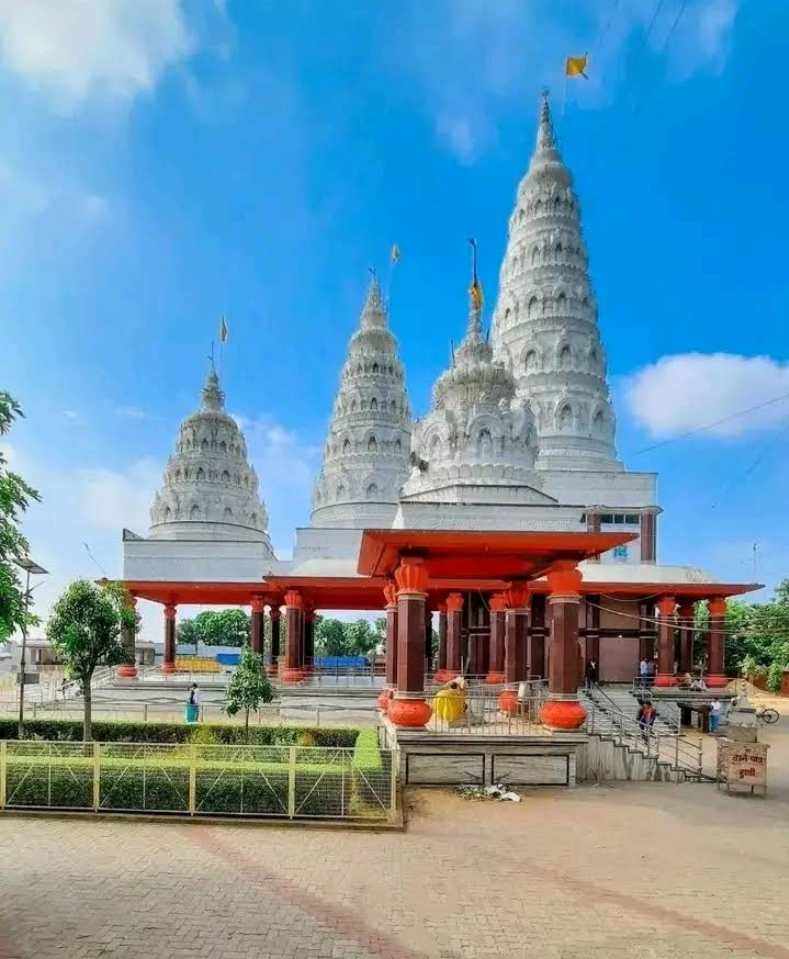
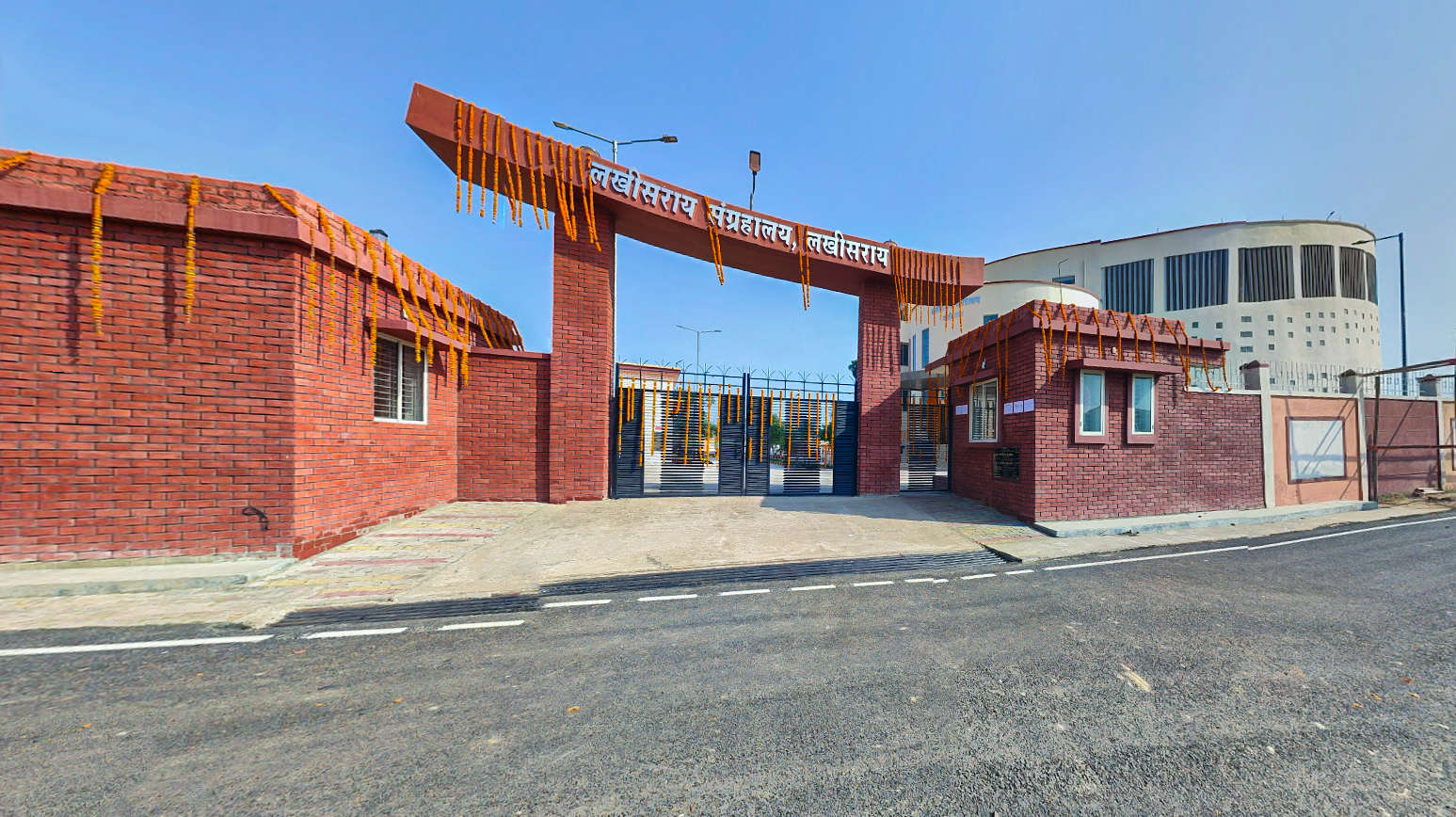
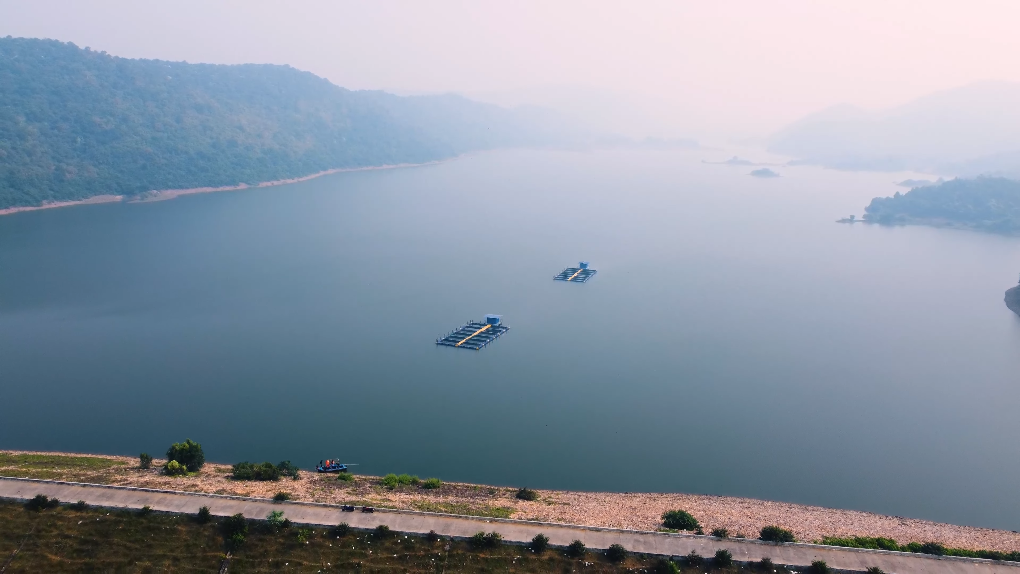
- Ashok Dham Lakhisarai Sangrahalaya Lakhisarai Shringi Rishi Dam

- Location in Bihar, India
- Coordinates: 25°10′4″N 86°5′40″E
- Country: India
- State: Bihar
- Division: Munger
- District: Lakhisarai
- Established: 1992

Government
  - Body: Municipal council

Area
  - Total: 12 km^{2} (4.6 sq mi)

Population (2011)
  - Total: 99,979
  - Rank: 22nd in Bihar
  - Density: 653/km^{2} (1,690/sq mi)

Language
  - Official: Hindi
  - Additional official: Urdu
  - Regional languages: Maithili (Angika), Magahi
- Time zone: UTC+5:30 (IST)
- PIN: 811311
- Nearest city: Munger
- Sex ratio: 0.92 ♂/♀
- Literacy: 60.96%
- Lok Sabha constituency: Munger
- Vidhan Sabha constituency: Lakhisarai
- Civic agency: Municipal council
- Website: lakhisarai.bih.nic.in

Lakhisarai (archaic spelling: Luckeesarai) town is the administrative headquarters of Lakhisarai district in the Indian state of Bihar. The town has a population of 99,979 (2011 census). it is situated about 45 km west of Munger.

== Geography ==
Lakhisarai is located on 25°10′4″N 86°5′40″E. It has average elevation of 151 metres (495 ft). It's 130 km away from State Capital Patna.

=== Climate ===
The climate of Lakhisarai is subtropical (warm in summer and cold during winter). The Köppen climate classification sub-type for this climate is humid subtropical.

== Demographics ==
As of 2011 Indian Census, Lakhisarai had a total population of 99,979, of which 52,665 were males and 47,314 were females. Population within the age group of 0 to 6 years was 17,641. The total number of literates in Lakhisarai was 57,902, which constituted 57.9% of the population with male literacy of 63.9% and female literacy of 51.2%. The effective literacy rate of the population above 7 years of age in Lakhisarai was 70.3%, of which male literacy rate was 77.6% and female literacy rate was 62,2%. The Scheduled Castes and Scheduled Tribes population was 10,730 and 180 respectively. Lakhisaraihad 17214 households in 2011.

== Government ==
Lakhisarai Assembly constituency is one of 243 constituencies of legislative assembly of Bihar. It is part of Munger Lok Sabha constituency. Vijay Kumar Sinha from BJP party is mla from here.

== Tourist attractions ==
- Ashok Dham is a famous temple in Lakhisarai.
- Sringri Rishi Dham is a famous place in Lakhisarai.

== Transportation ==
Lakhisarai Junction railway station station code LKR. It's one of the major railway station in East Central Railways. Lakhisarai is connected to metropolitan ares of India, by the Delhi-Kolkata Main Line via Mugalsarai-Patna route.

== Education institutes ==
There are many colleges and schools located in Lakhisarai which improve the education system here, there are higher education institutes like Kendriya Vidyalaya here.

== Notable people ==
- Mathura Prasad Naveen, was an Indian Magahi language poet
- Giriraj Singh, Indian politician
- Vijay Kumar Sinha, Indian politician
