= Jamui =

- Town
- Location in Bihar, India
- Coordinates: 24°55′40″N 86°13′26″E
- Country: India
- State: Bihar
- Division: Munger
- District: Jamui
- Ward: 30 wards
- Named after: Jambhiya Gram

Government
  - Type: Chairman–Nagar Parishad
  - Body: Jamui Nagar Parishad
- Elevation: 78 m (256 ft)

Population (2011)
  - Total: 87,357

Languages
  - Official: Hindi and Magahi
  - Additional official: English
- Time zone: UTC+5:30 (IST)
- PIN: 811307
- Telephone code: 06345
- ISO 3166 code: IN-BR
- Vehicle registration: BR-46
- Sex ratio: 912/1000(2011) ♂/♀
- Website: www.jamui.nic.in

Jamui is a town and a municipality in Jamui district in the Indian state of Bihar. It is the district headquarter of Jamui district. Jamui was formed as a district on 21 February 1991 as a result of its separation from Munger. It is part of Munger Division. The town is situated about 60 km South-West of Munger.

Historical existence of Jamui has been observed from the period of Mahabharta war. Archaeological and historical evidence shows its close association with the Jain tradition for a long past to the present time. A large part of this area is covered by forest.

There are mainly two hypotheses which have been mentioned by historians regarding the origin of the name of the district Jamui. The first hypothesis said that the name of Jamui derived from "Jambhiya Gram" or "Jribhikgram" village, which has the place of attaining ‘Omniscience’ (Kevala Jnana) of Vardhaman Mahavira and according to another hypothesis the name Jamui is originated from Jambuwani.

== Geography ==
Jamui is located at 24.92°N 86.22°E. It has an average elevation of 78 metres (255 feet).

Jamui is located in a transitional zone between the vast, fertile Gangetic plain to the north and the hilly margins of the Chota Nagpur Plateau to the south. The Kiul River, which flows by Jamui's east side, has its headwaters in this upland region. During the monsoon rains, the Kiul can become very powerful and turbulent, and in 1949 it flooded and destroyed the bridge northeast of Jamui.

Jamui is well connected to the rest of the country via road while the Delhi-Howrah rail line is 3 kilometres (1.9 mi) away at Mallepur (Malaypur railway station is also known as Jamui railway station). Lok Nayak Jayaprakash Airport in Patna is about 161 kilometres (100 mi) and Gaya Airport 136 kilometres (85 mi) away.

Situated along the Bihar-Jharkhand border, Jamui is dotted with hills and the small retreat town of Simultala falls within the Jhajha block, on the main Delhi-Howrah rail line. The town of Gidhaur, situated 17 kilometres (11 mi) away was the seat of kings during the British Raj and many buildings from the period still survive. Minto Tower in Gidhaur is a prime example of architecture from the period. Jamui district is also known for having many places related to the origin of Jainism.

The district has untapped reserves of resources including mica, coal, gold and iron ore.

== History ==
An early historic site near Jamui is the old Indpegarh fort, located in the village of Indpe to the south.

Present Jamui came under the Gidhaur chieftaincy before independence which was founded by the Chandel Rajput and they ruled it from 1262-1952.

At the turn of the 20th century, Jamui was described as being mostly "one long street, forming a continuation of the railway road". This main street was lined with shops and shopkeepers' houses. Secondary streets branched off at right angles and led to the residential parts of town. The Jamui Subdivision office was located at the northeast end of town, in a plain masonry building. About half a kilometre to the southwest was an open space, where the police station stood. A couple buildings away from the police station was the dispensary, which had been completed in 1874. At the west end of town was a distillery.

After a flood on the Kiul in 1949 destroyed the bridge northeast of town, a new one was built.

By 1960, there were a cooperative bank and boys' high school at the northeast of town, near the subdivisional office. To the east of the subdivisional office was a children's park, which had been built in 1950. East of the children's park was a dak bungalow maintained by the district board, and north of the park was a large tank, which had been de-silted in 1951 as a way to give employment to people who were struggling due to general economic shortages. The Nehru maidan, across from the dak bungalow, had been named after Jawaharlal Nehru, who had given an address here at one point. The Gilani Girls' M. E. School, established in 1939 and named after the presiding subdivisional officer at the time, had been built in front of the police thana. A public library, the Gandhi Adhyayan Mandal, had also been built. Other buildings included a first-grade college, a state-run hospital, and an "electric power house". A filling station had been set up along the main road, and motor vehicle traffic was becoming increasingly heavy. Various passenger buses, connecting Jamui with Munger and other places in the region.

== Demographics ==
As of 2011 India census, Jamui had a population of 87,357. Males constitute 52.6% of the population and females 47.26%. Jamui has an average literacy rate of 64.33%, lower than the national average of 74.04%: male literacy is 57.39%, and female literacy is 42.6%. In Jamui, 16.22% of the population is under 6 years of age.

== Economy ==
In 2006 the Ministry of Panchayati Raj named Jamui one of the country's 250 most backward districts (out of a total of 640). It is one of the 36 districts in Bihar currently receiving funds from the Backward Regions Grant Fund Programme (BRGF).

Grain and timber play important roles in Jamui's economy.

== Divisions ==
1. No. of Police District 1
2. No. of Sub-Divisions 1
3. No. of Blocks 10
4. No. of Circles 10
5. No. of Police Stations 16
6. No. of Panchayats 153
7. No. of Villages 1,506

== Notable people ==
- Onkarnath Baranwal: an Indian politician from the state of Bihar, Batiya.
- Chirag Paswan, Member Of Indian Parliament, National President Lok Janshakti Party (Ram Vilas)
- Chandrashekhar Singh: a member of Indian National Congress and served as the Chief Minister of Bihar from Aug 1983 to Mar 1985.
- Digvijay Singh: an Indian politician from the state of Bihar and an independent Member of the Parliament of India representing Banka in the Lok Sabha.
- Shreyasi Singh, Member of Legislative Assembly of Bihar and International Shooter
