= Bihar Gramin Bank =

Regional Rural Bank in Bihar, India

- Native name: बिहार ग्रामीण बैंक
- Type: Regional rural bank
- Industry: Banking, financial services
- Predecessor: Dakshin Bihar Gramin Bank; Uttar Bihar Gramin Bank
- Founded: May 1, 2025; 16 months ago
- Headquarters: Patna, Bihar, India
- Number of locations: 2885 Branches (2025)
- Area served: Bihar, India
- Key people: Mukul Sahay (Chairman)
- Products: Retail banking, corporate banking, investment banking, mortgage loans, wealth management, debit cards, UPI, internet banking, mobile banking, finance and insurance
- Owner: Government of India (50%), Punjab National Bank (35%), Government of Bihar (15%)
- Parent: Ministry of Finance, Government of India
- Website: bgb.bank.in

Bihar Gramin Bank (BGB) is an Indian Regional rural bank (RRB) in the state of Bihar, India established on 1 May 2025 by the amalgamation of two RRBs namely Dakshin Bihar Gramin Bank and Uttar Bihar Gramin Bank. under The "One State, One RRB" policy of government of India. The bank operates in all 38 districts of Bihar state and has 2885 branches as on 1 May 2025. It is under the ownership of Ministry of Finance, Government of India

It functions under Regional Rural Banks' Act 1976 and is sponsored by Punjab National Bank.

== History ==
=== Dakshin Bihar Gramin Bank ===
Dakshin Bihar Gramin Bank was an Indian Regional Rural Bank (RRB) in the state of Bihar, India. It was under the ownership of Ministry of Finance, Government of India. The bank was established on 2019 by amalgamation of two RRBs namely Madhya Bihar Gramin Bank and Bihar Gramin Bank (old). The bank was sponsored by Punjab National Bank. The Bank operates in 20 districts of Bihar. The Bank had 1078 branches.

=== Uttar Bihar Gramin Bank ===
Uttar Bihar Gramin Bank was a Regional Rural Bank (RRB) in the State of Bihar, India. It was under the ownership of Ministry of Finance, Government of India. It was one of the largest regional rural banks in India in terms of branch network, staff strength and area of operation. It was established by the amalgamation of Uttar Bihar Kshetriya Gramin Bank and Kosi Kshetriya Gramin Bank. It was sponsored by Central Bank of India in the state of Bihar and headquartered in Muzaffarpur.

On 1 May 2025 Uttar Bihar Gramin Bank was merged with Dakshin Bihar Gramin Bank to form Bihar Gramin Bank.

== See also ==
- List of banks in India
- Regional rural bank
