= Munger division =

Administrative division in Bihar, India

- Division of Bihar
- Location of Munger division in Bihar
- Coordinates: 24°45′N 85°00′E
- Country: India
- State: Bihar
- Headquarters: Munger
- Districts: Munger, Begusarai, Jamui, Khagaria, Sheikhpura, Lakhisarai

Government
  - Commissioner: Avneesh Kumar Singh (IAS)

Population (2011)
  - Total: 9,362,742
- Website: mungerdivision.bih.nic.in

Munger division is an administrative geographical unit of Bihar state of India. Munger is the administrative headquarters of the division. The division consists of Munger district, Begusarai, Lakhisarai District, Jamui district, Khagaria district, and Sheikhpura district. Earlier all these districts were part of Munger (earlier known as Monghyr) district.

== See also ==
- Divisions of Bihar
- Districts of Bihar
