= Barahiya =

- Town
- Location in Bihar, India Barahiya (India)
- Coordinates: 25.2833°N 86.0333°E
- Country: India
- State: Bihar
- Division: Munger
- District: Lakhisarai

Population (2011)
  - Total: 43,032

Language
  - Official: Hindi
  - Additional official: Urdu
- Time zone: UTC+5:30 (IST)
- Postal code: 811302
- Vehicle registration: BR-53

Barahiya is a town and nagar parishad in Lakhisarai district in the Indian state of Bihar. It has a total population of 43,032. It lies on the southern bank of the river Ganges, about 116.8 km east of Patna

== Demographics ==
As of 2011 Indian Census, Barahiya had a total population of 43,032, of which 22,817 were males and 20,215 were females, with a sex ratio of 886. Population within the age group of 0 to 6 years was 6,706. The total number of literates in Barahiya was 26,746, which constituted 62.2% of the population with male literacy of 67.4% and female literacy of 56.2%. The effective literacy rate of 7+ population of Barahiya was 73.6%, of which male literacy rate was 80.1% and female literacy rate was 66.4%. The Scheduled Castes and Scheduled Tribes population was 4,185 and 28 respectively. Barahiya had 6893 households in 2011.

As of 2001 India census, Barahiya had a population of 39,745. Males constitute 53% of the population and females 47%. Barahiya has an average literacy rate of 53% which is well below the national average of 59.5%; with 61% of the males and 39% of females literate. 15% of the population is under 6 years of age.

== Transport ==
Barhiya is connected to major cities of India by the Delhi-Kolkata main line, as it falls on the Asansol-Patna section which runs along the historic Grand Trunk road.

== Notable people ==
- Giriraj Singh, Indian politician, Member of Parliament, Lok Sabha and Minister of Ministry of Rural Development and Ministry of Panchayati Raj in the Government of India.
