= Kiul Junction railway station =

Railway station in Lakhisarai, Bihar, India

KIUL JUNCTION

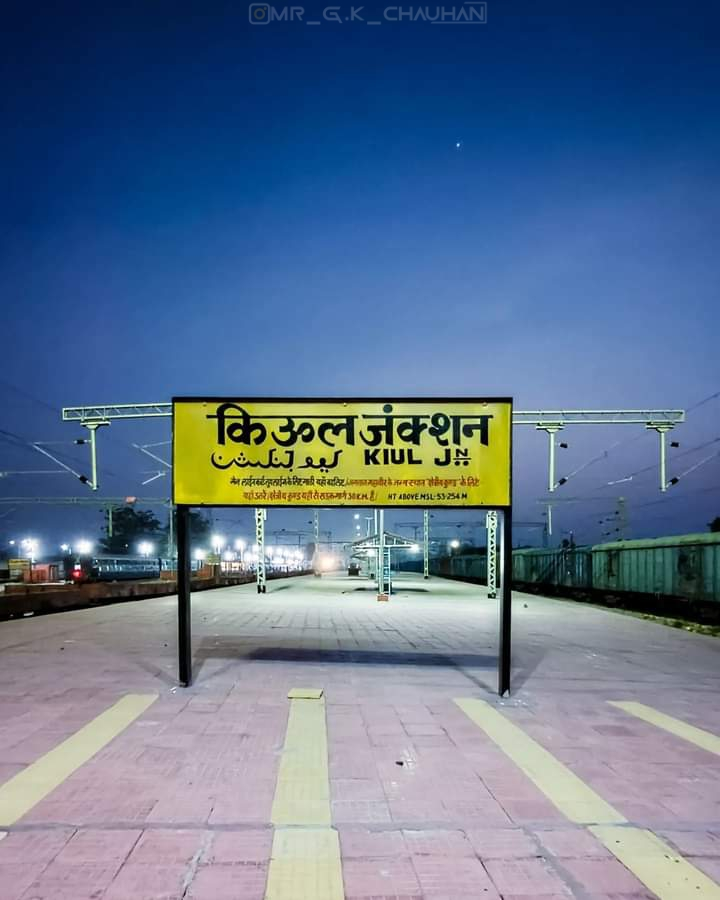
- Kiul Junction railway station nameboard

General information
- Location: Lakhisarai, Lakhisarai district, Bihar; India
- Coordinates: 25°10′19″N 86°6′30″E
- Elevation: 53 metres (174 ft)
- System: Indian Railways station
- Owner: Indian Railways
- Operator: East Central Railways
- Lines: Howrah–Delhi main line, Kiul–Khana Loop Line, Gaya–Kiul line, Barauni–Lakhisarai Section
- Platforms: 8
- Tracks: 11
- Connections: Howrah Junction; Delhi Junction; Bhagalpur Junction; Gaya Junction; Barauni junction

Construction
- Structure type: Standard (on ground station)
- Parking: 2

Other information
- Status: Functioning
- Station code: KIUL
- Zone(s): East Central Railway zone
- Division(s): Danapur

History
- Opened: 1864; 162 years ago
- Former names: Keul
Route map
Location

Kiul Junction railway station (station code: KIUL), is one of the major railway junctions in Danapur division of East Central Railway. Kiul is connected to metropolitan areas of India, by the Howrah–Delhi main line via Mugalsarai–Patna route which runs along the historic Grand Trunk Road. The Danapur railway division's main line crosses Sahibganj loop line at the Kiul Junction. The main line crosses the Kiul River between Kiul Junction and Lakhisarai Junction. The Gaya–Kiul line also starts from the Kiul Junction.

Kiul is located on the bank of Kiul River in Lakhisarai district in the Indian state of Bihar. This is the place where Mahavira, Tirthankara of Jainism, achieved Kevala Jnana. The Kiul railway station is on Howrah–Delhi main line. Most of the Patna, Gaya, Bhagalpur, Barauni and Howrah bound express trains coming from Howrah, Sealdah, Ranchi and Tatanagar stop here. Kiul junction is a busy station in East Bihar and entry station of East Central Railway and Eastern Railway. There are five routes in the Station: Gaya, Barauni, Bhagalpur, Howrah and Patna.

== Facilities ==
The major facilities available are waiting rooms, computerized reservation facility, Vehicle parking. The vehicles are allowed to enter the station premises. The station also has STD/ISD/PCO telephone booth, toilets, tea stall and book stall. Automatic ticket vending machines have been installed to reduce the queue for train tickets on the station. One of the two departmental catering units of Danapur division are located at Kiul Junction, the other being at Patna Junction.

=== Platforms ===
There are total eight platforms here. The platforms are interconnected with foot overbridge (FOB) towards JMP and Subway . Earlier the platforms were on ground type but now this railway station is on-going redevelopment and increased the height of platforms to elevated type with addition of two platforms from six to eight.

== Nearest airport ==
The nearest airport to Kiul station are

1. Gaya Airport 141 kilometres (88 mi)
2. Lok Nayak Jayaprakash Airport, Patna 126 kilometres (78 mi)
3. Birsa Munda Airport, Ranchi 247 kilometres (153 mi)
4. Netaji Subhas Chandra Bose International Airport, Kolkata
5. Deoghar Airport

== Trains ==
=== Trains originating from Kiul ===
- Malda Town–Kiul Intercity Express

While There are lot of Passenger and Express trains that has stop at Kiul.

== See also ==
- Lakhisarai
- Barauni
- East Central Railway zone
