= Lakhisarai district =

District in Bihar, India

Coordinates: 25°10′12″N 86°05′24″E

- District of Bihar
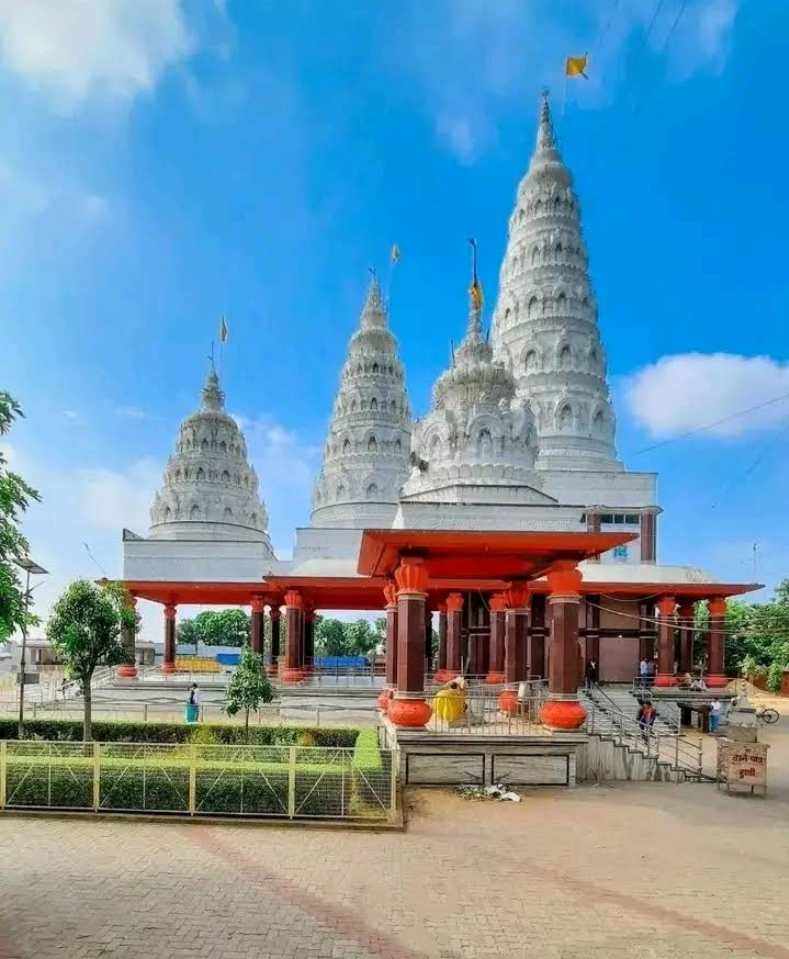
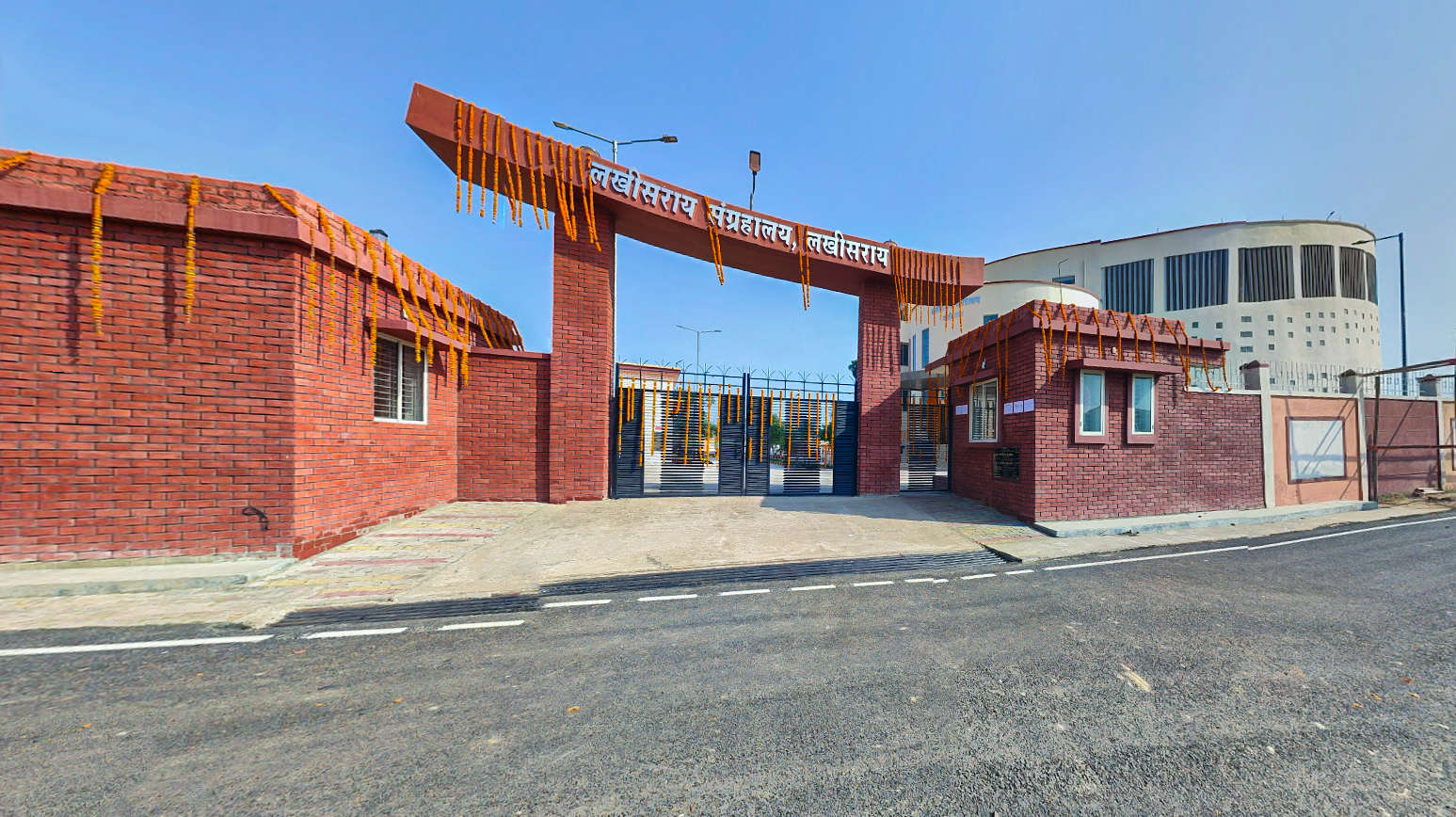
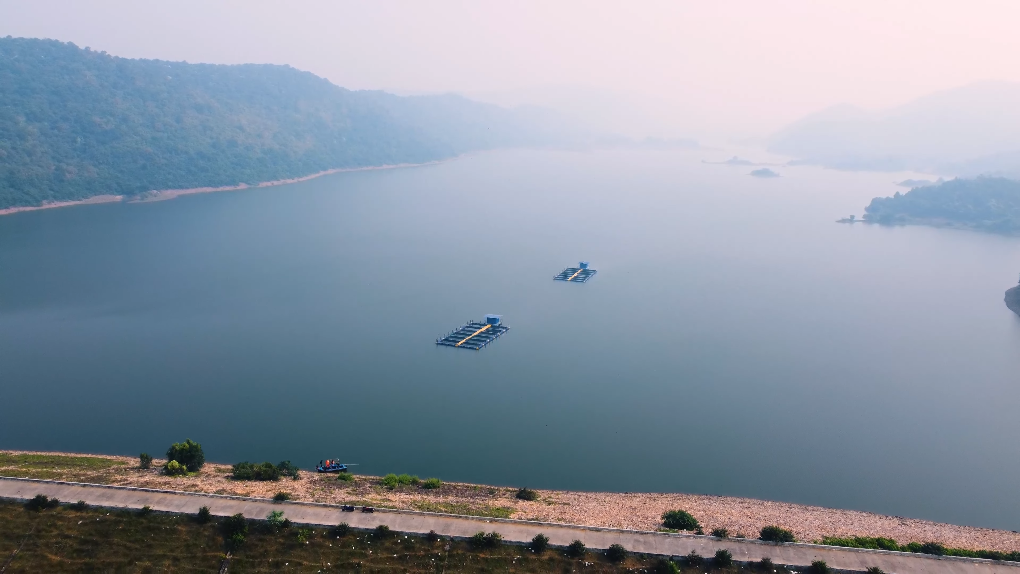
- Ashokdham Temple Lakhisarai Sangrahalaya Lakhisarai Shringi Rishi Dam
- Interactive map of Lakhisarai district
- Country: India
- State: Bihar
- Division: Munger
- Headquarters: Lakhisarai

Government
  - Lok Sabha constituencies: Munger

Area
  - Total: 1,228 km^{2} (474 sq mi)

Population (2011)
  - Total: 1,000,912
  - Density: 815.1/km^{2} (2,111/sq mi)

Demographics
  - Literacy: 64.95 per cent
  - Sex ratio: 900
- Time zone: UTC+05:30 (IST)
- Website: lakhisarai.bih.nic.in

Lakhisarai district is one of the thirty-eight districts of Bihar state, India, and Lakhisarai town is the administrative headquarters of this district. Lakhisarai district is a part of Munger Division. The district occupies an area of 1,228 km^{2} (474 sq mi).

== History ==
On 3 July 1994 this district was carved out from Munger district, which comprised the erstwhile Lakhisarai sub-division of the undivided district.

== Geography ==
Lakhisarai district occupies an area of 1,228 square kilometres (474 sq mi),

== Economy ==
In 2006 the Ministry of Panchayati Raj named Lakhisarai one of the country's 250 districts (out of a total of 640). It is one of the 36 districts in Bihar currently receiving funds from the Backward Regions Grant Fund Programme (BRGF).

Industrial background; there are various fertiliser and pesticide factories in the district, including Bihar Mineral Industries. The market for fabrics in the district also flourishes with many old and new shops, and there are many factories like Sindur.

National Thermal Power Corporation Limited and Bihar State Power Generation Company Ltd has signed Memorandum of Understanding to set up 1320MW thermal power plant in Kajra.

== Divisions ==
The district consists only one sub-division Lakhisarai, which is divided into Seven developmental blocks, namely, Lakhisarai, Surajgarha, Barahiya, Halsi, Pipariya, Ramgarh Chowk and Chanan.

The district headquarters Lakhisarai is a city with mixed population, the majority being the upper-caste (Bhumihaar-Brahmins) people. Still under the process of development, the city has one newly constructed PCC road and a New bypass is constructed recently which gives some relaxation from traffic jams in the city. The Law and Order as well as development process is taking place during Nitish Kumar government's tenure. Also, Piribazar, Chanan police stations are naxal-prone due to their geographical layout. The city well known for its sindur (vermilion) production.

== Demographics ==
Historical population
Year	Pop.	±% p.a.
1901	229,288	—
1911	236,466	+0.31%
1921	224,854	−0.50%
1931	253,195	+1.19%
1941	286,239	+1.23%
1951	316,343	+1.01%
1961	352,448	+1.09%
1971	439,256	+2.23%
1981	533,840	+1.97%
1991	646,395	+1.93%
2001	802,225	+2.18%
2011	1,000,912	+2.24%

Religions in Lakhisarai district (2011)
Religion	Percent
Hinduism	95.55%
Islam	4.08%
Other or not stated	0.37%

According to the 2011 census Lakhisarai district has a population of 1,000,912, This gives it a ranking of 445th in India (out of a total of 640). The district has a population density of 815 inhabitants per square kilometre (2,110/sq mi). Its population growth rate over the decade 2001-2011 was 24.74%. Lakhisarai has a sex ratio of 900 females for every 1000 males, and a literacy rate of 64.95%. 14.29% of the population lives in urban areas. Scheduled Castes and Scheduled Tribes made up 15.31% and 0.83% of the population respectively.

Languages in Lakhisarai district (2011)
1. Magahi (47.0%)
2. Hindi (29.1%)
3. 'Other' Hindi (21.2%)
4. Urdu (1.73%)
5. Others (1.05%)

At the time of the 2011 Census of India, 46.96% of the population in the district spoke Magahi, 29.09% Hindi and 1.73% Urdu as their first language. 21.17% of the population recorded a language classified as 'Others' under Hindi on the census. The main languages are Magahi and Angika, but both are counted as Hindi under the census.

== Tourist places ==
Although Lakhisarai is not widely known for its tourist destinstion still there are few tourist places mainly religious tourism is dominant here.

Ashok Dham Temple (Indradamneshwar Mahadev Mandir) Ancient Shiva temple, dating back to 8th–12th century, rediscovered in 1977.It Features a massive black stone Shivling (~7½ ft tall) and an impressive temple complex. Major pilgrimage center of Lakhisarai especially during Shivratri and the Shravan month. Sringri Rishi Dham A serene temple complex nestled amid hills, waterfalls, & natural hot springs (“Sita Kund”).Believed to be the site of the tonsuring of Lord Rama and his brothers.Popular for tranquil baths, picnics, and spiritual rituals; features a small dam & ponds.

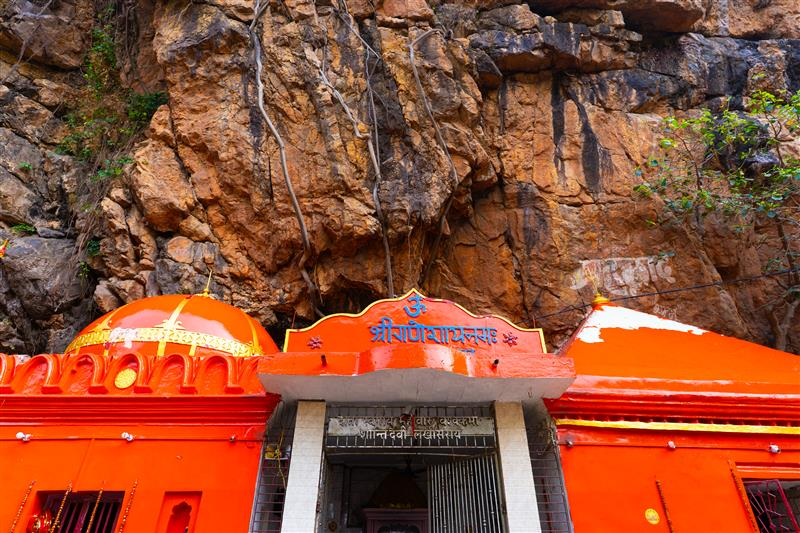
Shringi rishi ashram

Lali Pahari is an Archaeological area—site of the first hilltop Buddhist monastery in the Gangetic Plains (8th–12th c.).Excavations reveal stupas, viharas, monk cells, and evidence of female monks like Vijayaśrī Bhadra.It offers panoramic views, picnicking, and peaceful exploration. Bhagwati Asthan of Barhiya: a hilltop temple dedicated to Goddess Bhagwati, attracting many devotees

Other Notable Spots Jalappa Asthan, Abhinath Asthan, Shree Shesh Nag Temple, Rameshavar Dham, Maharani Sthan Abhaipur – revered local shrines suitable for spiritual visits.

== Politics ==
District	No.	Constituency	Name	Party	Alliance	Remarks
Lakhisarai	167	Suryagarha	Ramanand Mandal	JD(U)	NDA	
Lakhisarai	168	Lakhisarai	Vijay Kumar Sinha	BJP	NDA	Deputy Chief Minister (Till 14 April 2026)

=== Notable towns ===
- Barahiya
- Halsi
- Lakhisarai
- Surajgarha

=== Notable villages ===
- Babhangawan
- Baghaur
- Balgudar
- Bhaluee
- Maheshpur
- Nijai
- Pokhrama
- Sabikpur

== Notable people ==
- Giriraj Singh, Minister of Rural Development, Government of India

== See also ==
- Patna
