= Ravneshwar Prasad Singh =

Maharaja of Gidhaur 1885/1923

The Honourable Ravneshwar Prasad Singh KCIE

Maharaja of Gidhaur
- Reign: c. 1885 – c. 1923
- Predecessor: Shiv Prasad Singh
- Successor: Chandra Mouleshwar Prasad Singh
- Born: c. 1860
- Died: 1923 (aged 62–63)
- Dynasty: Chandel
- Father: Shiv Prasad Singh
- Children: Chandra Mouleshwar Prasad Singh

Sir Ravneshwar Prasad Singh was the Maharaja of Gidhaur from 1885 until his death in 1923.

== Early life, education, and family ==
He was born in 1860 to Shiv Prasad Singh, the Maharaja of Gidhaur. He was brought up by his grandfather Jaimangal Singh and was educated in Hindi, English, Sanskrit and Persian. He was taught Vedanta and other Hindu texts and was given a course in the details of estate management. He married in 1885 and had one son, Chandra Mouleshwar Prasad Singh, and three daughters, who went on to marry in Kanore, Neemrana and Diggi.

== Reign ==
Upon the death of his father in 1885, he succeeded him on the throne of Gidhaur. He was formally installed on the throne on 18 September 1885. The then Lieutenant-Governor of Bengal, Rivers Thompson, had on 28 August 1866, at Bhagalpur, conferred on him a khilat to recognise him as successor to his father. He was exempted from attending civil courts in person. He inaugurated many useful educational, social and religious reforms for the advancement of his people's welfare. He commissioned a bazaar, a school, a free dispensary and a guest house in Gidhaur. He also established a Sanskrit Vidyalaya where free education was imparted to Brahmins. He had modernised his ancestral residence, Sri Vilas Palace, and built a new palace which was named Sukh Niwas. When, due to the failure of the monsoon rains, distress was caused in larger Bihar and Orissa in 1919, he gave employment to a large number of people on his estate by constructing irrigation reservoirs.

== Public career ==
He was appointed a member of the local board of Jamui in 1887. In 1888, he was made a member of the district board of Monghyr. In 1890, he was granted the powers of a magistrate. He was made a member of the Bengal Legislative Council in 1893 and served many years on the council. When the province of Bihar and Orissa was created, he was made a non-official member of its Legislative Council.

== Personal interests ==
He helped establish the Bihar and Orissa Research Society on 20 January 1915. He was a vice-patron and was elected a life member of the society on 8 April 1918. He was a member of the British Indian Association of Bengal.

=== Religion ===
He was a staunch adherent of Hinduism, in which he was well-versed, and used to devote a major portion of his time to practising his faith. He used to maintain in his estate a series of temples and almshouses where ration and fuel were distributed free of cost to all. He built a temple dedicated to Shiva and Parvati. He once carried pitchers of water from the Ganges all the way from Jahangra to Baidyanath Temple in Deoghar to bathe the lingam there.

== Death ==
He died in 1923 and was succeeded in his title, rank and dignity by his son Chandra Mouleshwar Prasad Singh.

== Honours ==
He was made a Knight Commander of the Order of the Indian Empire by Queen Victoria in 1885.
