= Giridhari Yadav =

Indian politician (born 1961)

- Yadav in 2019

Member of Parliament, Lok Sabha
- Incumbent
- Assumed office 23 May 2019
- Preceded by: Jay Prakash Narayan Yadav
- Constituency: Banka
- In office 13 May 2004 – 16 May 2009
- Preceded by: Digvijay Singh
- Succeeded by: Digvijay Singh
- Constituency: Banka
- In office 10 May 1996 – 3 March 1998
- Preceded by: Pratap Singh
- Succeeded by: Digvijay Singh
- Constituency: Banka

Member of the Bihar Legislative Assembly
- In office 24 November 2010 – 23 May 2019
- Preceded by: Janardan Manjhi
- Succeeded by: Ramdeo Yadav
- Constituency: Belhar
- In office 2000–2004
- Preceded by: Bhola Prasad Yadav
- Succeeded by: Rajkishore Prasad
- Constituency: Katoria
- In office 1995–1996
- Preceded by: Suresh Prasad Yadav
- Succeeded by: Bhola Prasad Yadav
- Constituency: Katoria

Personal details
- Born: 14 April 1961 (age 65) Banka, Bihar, India
- Party: Janata Dal (United)
- Spouse: Sumitra Yadav
- Children: 3
- Occupation: Politician
- As of 15 July, 2019

Giridhari Yadav (born 14 April 1961) is an Indian politician, Member of Parliament (Loksabha) and member of Janata Dal (United) political party. He represents Banka Lok Sabha Constituency, Bihar.

Yadav has been elected four times into the Lok sabha and four times in Bihar Legislative Assembly. He was elected to Bihar Legislative Assembly and 11th lok Sabha with Janata Dal, while he was in RJD he was elected to Bihar Vidhan Sabha and 14th Lok sabha. Yadav joined JD(U) in 2010 and has been elected twice to Bihar Vidhan Sabha with JDU(U) and 17th Lok Sabha.

In 2024 Indian General Election, he won for a fourth time as an MP (Loksabha) with JD(U) from the Banka.

== Early life ==
Giridhari Yadav was born on 14 April 1961 in Banka, Bihar. His father, Dhano Yadav, was a school teacher in Indian Railways; his mother is Jagti Devi. He is one of seven children of Dhano and Jagti.

Yadav earned a B.A. degree in history from Bhagalpur University in 1982. Then he moved to Madhya Pradesh to pursue postgraduate studies at DHG University, Sagar where he obtained M.A. in History and later obtained LLB in Law from Bhagalpur University at the age of 33. Yadav married Sumitra Devi in 1976 and has one daughter and two sons.

== Early career ==
Giridhari Yadav was a history student in Madhya Pradesh and started his political career in Sagar, Madhya Pradesh as a youth co-ordinator in Indian Youth Congress in the Rajiv Gandhi Government (1983-1985). He was said to be close to former chief minister Arjun Singh, B.R. Yadav and Santosh Sahu.

== Political career ==
Giridhari Yadav belongs to a socialist class of politicians. He was in Indian Youth Congress during Rajiv Gandhi's tenure and was associated with the likes of V. P. Singh. Yadav went back to Bihar after campaigning in Madhya Pradesh Assembly elections, in August 1994 and worked as a party worker for Janata Dal. In 1995, he got the party ticket to contest from Katoria, Bihar in the Bihar Legislative Assembly elections. After Yadav's triumphant victory in Bihar Legislative Assembly elections, he went on to win the 11th Lok Sabha for Banka, Bihar.

In 1997, Yadav was one of seventeen Lok Sabha MPs to form Rashtriya Janata Dal (RJD) as a break away party from Janata Dal in New Delhi. He lost to Digvijay Singh in 12th Lok Sabha elections on RJD ticket by less than 1% of total votes. Yadav got elected as MLA for second time from Katoria, Bihar in 2000, and in 1999 came close to winning 13th Lok Sabha as an independent candidate losing only by a margin of 2% of total votes.

In 2004, Yadav successfully defeated Digvijay Singh and was elected to 14th Lok Sabha. After being denied a party ticket by RJD while being a sitting MP, Giridhari Yadav had a fall out with Lalu Prasad Yadav. In 2010, Yadav joined Janata Dal (United) and was elected to Bihar Legislative Assembly from Belhar, Bihar. He became the General Secretary of JD(U) in 2014. Yadav resigned from the post in 2015 after being issued a notice for mingling with alliance RJD leader Mohd. Shahabuddin. He won his fourth Bihar Legislative Assembly in 2015 for Belhar, Bihar.

In 2019 he won with a record margin to be elected to the 17th Lok Sabha from Banka and served in the Parliamentary Standing Committee on Finance. In 2024 he was reelected to the Parliament as a member of 18th Lok Sabha.

== Positions held ==
Period	Positions	Note
1983-1985	Youth Coordinator, Indian Youth Congress	
1995-1996	Member, Bihar Legislative Assembly	1st term in Bihar Vidhan Sabha
1995-1996	Member, Public Accounts Committee, Bihar Legislative Assembly	
1995	Whip Janata Dal	
1996-1998	Elected to 11th Lok Sabha	1st term in Lok Sabha
1996	Member, Parliamentary Standing Committee on Petroleum and Natural Gas	
2000-2004	Re-Elected to Bihar Legislative Assembly	2nd Term in Bihar Vidhan Sabha
2004-2009	Re-elected to 14th Lok Sabha	2nd term in Lok Sabha
2004	Member, Parliamentary Standing Committee on Industry	
2010-2015	Re-elected to Bihar Legislative Assembly	3rd term in Bihar Vihdan Sabha
2010	Member, Estimates committee, Bihar Legislative Assembly	
2013	Member, Public Accounts Committee, Bihar Legislative Assembly	
2014	General Secretary, Janata Dal(United)	
2015	Re-elected to Bihar Legislative Assembly	4th term in Bihar Vidhan Sabha
2015	Member, Library Committee	
2019	Re-elected to 17th Lok Sabha	3rd term in Lok Sabha
2019	Member, Standing Committee on Finance	
2024	Re-elected to 18th Lok Sabha	4th term in Lok Sabha
