= Vijay Prakash Yadav =

Indian politician

Member of the Bihar Legislative Assembly
- In office 2015–2020
- Preceded by: Ajay Pratap
- Succeeded by: Shreyasi Singh
- Constituency: Jamui

Minister for Labour Resource Department
- In office 2015–2017

Personal details
- Party: Rashtriya Janata Dal
- Relations: Jay Prakash Narayan Yadav (brother)

Vijay Prakash Yadav is an Indian Politician. He was a Member of the Bihar Legislative Assembly from Jamui until 2020 and former Minister for Labour Resource Department, Government of Bihar from 2015 to 2017. He is younger brother of former Union Minister Of State For Water Resources and senior RJD leader Jaiprakash Narayan Yadav.
