= Surendra Prasad Singh Kushwaha =

Indian politician

Surendra Prasad Singh

Member of the Bihar Legislative Assembly
- In office 1995–2010
- Preceded by: Madhav Mandal
- Succeeded by: Janardan Manjhi
- Constituency: Amarpur Assembly constituency

Minister for Health, Government of Bihar
- In office 1997–2000

Personal details
- Party: Rashtriya Janata Dal
- Parent: Adhiklal Singh (father)

Surendra Prasad Singh also known as Surendra Singh Kushwaha is an Indian politician and former member of Bihar Legislative Assembly from Amarpur Assembly constituency in Banka district of Bihar. Singh has served as the member of Bihar Legislative Assembly for three terms. He won four elections from Amarpur constituency from 1995 to 2010, as a candidate of Rashtriya Janata Dal. He was defeated in 2010 assembly elections by Janardan Manjhi, which caused an end to his career as active politician.

== Political career ==
Singh has worked with Rashtriya Janata Dal, and has remained three term Member of Bihar Legislative Assembly, as a candidate of RJD. However, long after his electoral defeat in 2010 Assembly elections, he joined Rashtriya Lok Samata Party led by Upendra Kushwaha.The accession to RLSP took place at a conference organised by RLSP for pushing reforms in education sector in the state of Bihar; this conference was named "Shiksha Sudhar Sankalp Mahabhiyan" (the great pledge for educational reform).

He also served as Minister for Health in the Government of Bihar from 1997 to 2000. Besides this, he was also a former speaker of Bihar Legislative Assembly. In 2023, he joined Bharatiya Janata Party with his supporters.
