= Banka Lok Sabha constituency =

Lok Sabha Constituency in Bihar

Coordinates: 24.9°N 86.9°E

Banka
- Lok Sabha constituency

Constituency details
- Country: India
- Region: East India
- State: Bihar
- Established: 1957
- Reservation: None

Member of Parliament
- 18th Lok Sabha
- Incumbent Giridhari Yadav
- Party: JD(U)
- Alliance: NDA
- Elected year: 2024

Banka Lok Sabha constituency is one of the 40 Lok Sabha constituencies in Bihar state in eastern India. This comprises the Banka district.

== Vidhan Sabha segments ==
Presently, Banka Lok Sabha constituency comprises the following six Vidhan Sabha (legislative assembly) segments:

#	Name	District	Member	Party	2024 lead
157	Sultanganj	Bhagalpur	Lalit Narayan Mandal	JD(U)	JD(U)
159	Amarpur	Banka	Jayant Raj Kushwaha	JD(U)	JD(U)
160	Dhoraiya (SC)	Banka	Manish Kumar	JD(U)	JD(U)
161	Banka	Banka	Ramnarayan Mandal	BJP	JD(U)
162	Katoria (ST)	Banka	Puran Lal Tudu	BJP	RJD
163	Belhar	Banka	Manoj Yadav	JD(U)	JD(U)

== Members of Lok Sabha ==
The following is the list of the Members of Parliament elected from this constituency.

Year	Name	Party
1957	Shakuntala Devi	Indian National Congress
1962	Shakuntala Devi	Indian National Congress
1967	Beni Shanker Sharma	Bharatiya Jana Sangh
1971	Shiv Chandrika Prasad	Indian National Congress
1973^	Madhu Limaye	Socialist Party
1977	Madhu Limaye	Janata Party
1980	Chandrashekhar Singh	Indian National Congress
1984	Manorama Singh	Indian National Congress
1985^	Chandrashekhar Singh	Indian National Congress
1986^	Manorama Singh	Indian National Congress
1989	Pratap Singh	Janata Dal
1991	Pratap Singh	Janata Dal
1996	Giridhari Yadav	Janata Dal
1998	Digvijay Singh	Samata Party
1999	Digvijay Singh	Janata Dal (United)
2004	Giridhari Yadav	Rashtriya Janata Dal
2009	Digvijay Singh	Independent
2010^	Putul Kumari	Independent
2014	Jay Prakash Narayan Yadav	Rashtriya Janata Dal
2019	Giridhari Yadav	Janata Dal (United)
2024	Giridhari Yadav	Janata Dal (United)

^ by-poll

== Election results ==
=== 2024 ===
2024 Indian general elections: Banka
Party	Candidate	Votes	%	±%
JD(U)	Giridhari Yadav	506,678	49.96	
RJD	Jay Prakash Narayan Yadav	4,02,834	39.72	
NOTA	None of the Above	34,889	3.44	
Majority		1,03,844		
Turnout		10,14,931	54.57	
JD(U) hold		Swing		

=== 2019 ===
2019 Indian general elections: Banka
Party	Candidate	Votes	%	±%
JD(U)	Giridhari Yadav	477,788	47.98	
RJD	Jay Prakash Narayan Yadav	2,77,256	27.84	
Independent	Putul Kumari	1,03,729	10.42	
Independent	Manoj Kumar Sah	44,398	4.46	
Majority		2,00,532	20.14	
Turnout		9,95,860	58.60	+0.56
JD(U) gain from RJD		Swing		

=== 2014 ===
2014 Indian general elections: Banka
Party	Candidate	Votes	%	±%
RJD	Jay Prakash Narayan Yadav	285,150	31.71	
BJP	Putul Kumari	2,75,006	30.58	
CPI	Sanjay Kumar	2,20,708	24.54	
IND.	Naresh Kumar Priyadarshi	30,814	3.43	
IND.	Alimuddin Ansari	12,871	1.43	
Majority		10,144	1.13	
Turnout		8,99,360	58.04	+9.21
RJD gain from BJP		Swing		

==== 2010 By-poll ====
By-elections, 2010: Banka
Party	Candidate	Votes	%	±%
Independent	Putul Kumari	2,88,958	43.48	
RJD	Jay Prakash Narayan Yadav	2,19,839	33.08	
BSP	I. R. S. Saini	57,702	8.68	
Majority				
Turnout		6,64,572	48.83	
Independent hold		Swing		

=== 2009 Lok Sabha ===
- Digvijay Singh (IND) : 185,762 votes
- Jay Prakash Narayan Yadav (RJD) : 157000

=== 2004 Lok Sabha ===
- Giridhari Yadav (RJD) : 339,880 votes
- Digvijay Singh (JD(U)) : 335,211

=== 1986 by-election ===
The 1986 by-election was held for the Banka seat. The election was won by the INC candidate (Chandrashekhar Singh) with 186237 votes, against George Fernandes of Janata Party with 156853 votes.
