= Ramdeo Yadav =

Indian politician

MLA of Belhar
- In office 24 October 2019 – 2020
- Preceded by: Giridhari Yadav
- Succeeded by: Manoj Yadav

Personal details
- Party: Rashtriya Janata Dal

Ramdeo Yadav is an Indian politician in the Rashtriya Janata Dal. He was elected as a member of the Bihar Legislative Assembly from Belhar on 24 October 2019.
