= Katoria Assembly constituency =

Constituency of the Bihar legislative assembly in India

Katoria
- Constituency No. 162 for the Bihar Legislative Assembly

Constituency details
- Country: India
- Region: East India
- State: Bihar
- District: Banka
- Lok Sabha constituency: Banka (Lok Sabha constituency)
- Established: 1951
- Total electors: 270,298
- Reservation: ST

Member of Legislative Assembly
- 18th Bihar Legislative Assembly
- Incumbent Puran Lal Tudu
- Party: BJP
- Alliance: NDA
- Elected year: 2025

Katoria is one of 243 constituencies of legislative assembly of Bihar. It is part of Banka Lok Sabha constituency along with other assembly constituencies viz. Amarpur, Banka, Belhar and Dhoraiya. The seat is reserved for Scheduled Tribes.

== Overview ==
Katoria comprises CD Blocks Katoria & Bounsi.

== Members of the Legislative Assembly ==
Year	Member	Party
1957	Piroo Manjhi	Indian National Congress
1957	Raghvendra Narain Singh	Indian National Congress
1961^	Munsa Murmu	Indian National Congress
1962	Kampa Murmu	Swatantra Party
1967	K. Sitaram	Bharatiya Jana Sangh
1972	Jay Prakash Singh	Independent politician
1977	Guneshwar Prasad Singh	Janata Party
1980	Suresh Prasad Yadav	Indian National Congress
1985	Suresh Prasad Yadav	Indian Congress
1990	Suresh Prasad Yadav	Indian National Congress
1995	Giridhari Yadav	Janata Dal
1996^	Bhola Prasad Yadav	Janata Dal
2000	Giridhari Yadav	Rashtriya Janata Dal
2005 (Feb)	Rajkishore Prasad	Lok Janshakti Party
2005 (Oct)	Rajkishore Prasad	Rashtriya Janata Dal
2010	Sonelal Hembram	Bharatiya Janata Party
2015	Sweety Sima Hembram	Rashtriya Janata Dal
2020	Nikki Hembram	Bharatiya Janata Party
2025	Puran Lal Tudu	Bharatiya Janata Party

== Election results ==
=== 2025 ===
2025 Bihar Legislative Assembly election: Katoria
Party	Candidate	Votes	%	±%
BJP	Puran Lal Tudu	94,260	48.07	+1.06
RJD	Sweety Sima Hembram	83,274	42.46	−0.52
Independent	Rekha Soren	3,652	1.86	
JSP	Salomi Murmu	2,443	1.25	
RLJP	Shiv Lal Hansda	2,257	1.15	
NOTA	None of the above	5,187	2.65	−0.67
Majority		10,986	5.61	+1.58
Turnout		196,105	72.55	+11.3
BJP gain from		Swing	NDA	

=== 2020 ===
2020 Bihar Legislative Assembly election: Katoria
Party	Candidate	Votes	%	±%
BJP	Nikki Hembram	74,785	47.01	+13.46
RJD	Sweety Sima Hembram	68,364	42.98	+1.63
JMM	Anjela Hansda	5,606	3.52	−9.68
JAP(L)	Roj Meri Kisku	2,941	1.85	
Apna Kisan Party	Etwari Tudu	2,101	1.32	
NOTA	None of the above	5,279	3.32	−0.4
Majority		6,421	4.03	−3.77
Turnout		159,076	61.25	+4.4
BJP gain from RJD		Swing		

=== 2015 ===
Bihar Assembly election, 2015: Katoria
Party	Candidate	Votes	%	±%
RJD	Sweety Sima Hembram	54,760	41.35	
BJP	Nikki Hembram	44,423	33.55	
JMM	Anjala Hansda	17,481	13.2	
Independent	Maikal Hasada	2,478	1.87	
Independent	Umesh Hembram	2,064	1.56	
NCP	Pushpalata Murmu	1,926	1.45	
Independent	Rekha Kumari Soren	1,673	1.26	
BVM	Rajaram Soren	1,364	1.03	
Garib Janta Dal (Secular)	Anil Kumar Marandi	1,324	1.0	
NOTA	None of the above	4,928	3.72	
Majority		10,337	7.8	
Turnout		132,421	56.85	
RJD gain from BJP		Swing		

== See also ==
- List of Assembly constituencies of Bihar
