= Janardan Manjhi =

Indian politician (1943–2021)

Janardhan Manjhi Kushwaha

Former Member of Bihar Legislative Assembly
- Constituency: Amarpur Assembly constituency and Belhar Assembly constituency

Personal details
- Born: 1943 Banka district, Bihar, British Raj
- Died: 20 July 2021 (aged 78)
- Party: Janata Dal (United)
- Children: Jayant Raj Kushwaha

Janardhan Manjhi (1943 – 20 July 2021) was an Indian politician. He was an agriculturist and studied up to Class X. He won the Amarpur seat in the 2010 Bihar Legislative Assembly election.

He retained the Amarpur seat in the 2015 Bihar Legislative Assembly election, standing as the Janata Dal (United) candidate. Prior to the election Manjhi had declared assets worth 79,500,000 Indian rupees.

His son Jayant Raj Kushwaha is the current Member of Legislative Assembly who is currently representing the same Amarpur (Vidhan Sabha constituency) of Bihar. He died at the age of 78 on 20 July 2021.

== Political career ==
Manjhi was a resident of Baunsi in Banka district of Bihar. His political career started in 2001, when he won the elections to the Zila Parishad. Prior to this election, he was serving as the president of the district unit of Janata Dal (United) for the Banka. He was considered close to the former Union Minister Digvijay Singh and was working for the state's transport corporation in Bihar. Manjhi secured victory in the legislative assembly elections of 2005 from the Belhar Assembly constituency, defeating Ramdev Yadav of Rashtriya Janata Dal. This was considered as one of his greatest political achievement by the political analysts, as the particular seat was considered to be a stronghold of RJD for long. Earlier, Manjhi had contested from the same constituency against Yadav but was defeated as Belhar was considered to be a Yadav caste dominated constituency. In the elections to Bihar Legislative Assembly in 2010 too, Manjhi was successful in winning the Amarpur constituency.

The change in constituency took place after veteran leader of RJD, Giridhari Yadav joined JD(U) and the officials of the party decided to allow him contest from the Belhar constituency. In 2015, Manjhi again contested from the Amarpur constituency and he defeated Mrinal Shekhar of Bharatiya Janata Party this time. In 2020, due to ill health and ageing issues, he decided not to contest the elections and his son Jayant Raj was the candidate of JD(U) from Amarpur. In a trilateral contest, Jayant was able to retain the seat.
