= Beni Shanker Sharma =

Indian politician

Member of Parliament, Lok Sabha
- In office 1967–1971
- Preceded by: Shakuntala Devi
- Succeeded by: Shiv Chandrika Prasad
- Constituency: Banka

Personal details
- Born: 24 January 1907 Banka, Bihar
- Party: Bharatiya Jan Sangh
- Other political affiliations: Indian National Congress
- Spouse: Ganga Devi (m. 1920)
- Children: 1 son
- Parent: Pandit Baliram Sharma (father)
- Education: Bachelor of Arts, Bachelor of Laws
- Alma mater: Bhagalpur University; Calcutta University

Beni Shanker Sharma (born 24 January 1907) was an Indian politician from the state of Bihar. Sharma was elected to Lok Sabha in 1967 from Banka, Bihar as a member of the Bharatiya Jan Sangh.
