= Gidhaur chieftaincy =

Chieftaincy in Bihar Subah

Gidhaur Raj
- 13th century–1952
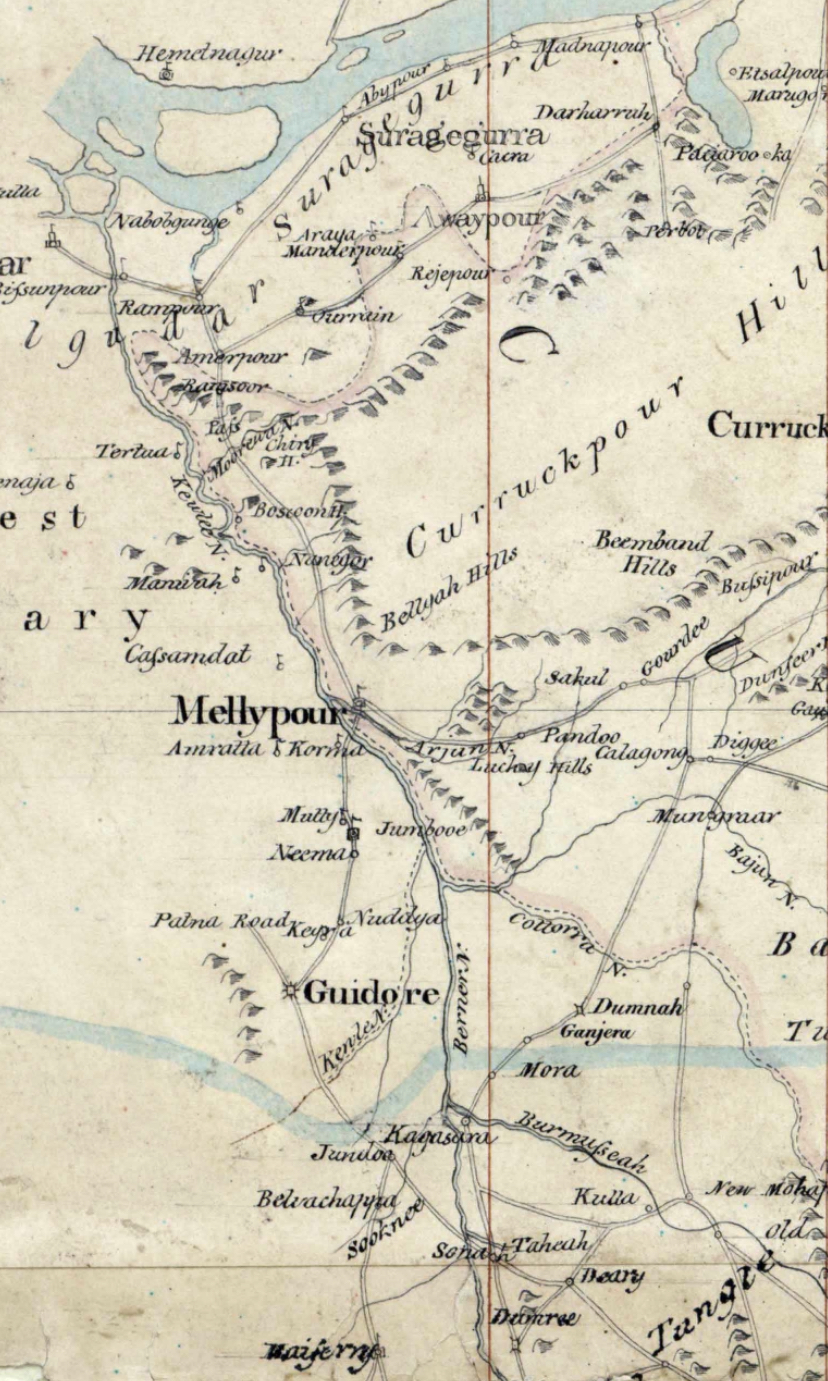
- Gidhaur (Guidore) and its surrounding area in the early 19th century
- Status: Independent (till 1570s); Tributary of the Mughal Empire (1570s onwards)
- Capital: Khaira; Lachhuar; Gidhaur
- Religion: Hinduism
- Historical era: Early modern period
  - Established: 13th century
  - Disestablished: 1952

Part of a series on the
History of Bihar
Ancient History
Prehistoric and Vedic Era

- Chirand (Neolithic) - Vedic period - Videha - Mithila (ancient) - Anga - Kikata

Urbanisation and Shramana

- Second Urbanisation - Rise of Shramana - Buddhism • Jainism • Ajivika

Gaṇasaṅghas

- Magadha - Vajjika League

  - Nāya
  - Vajji (tribe)
  - Licchavis of Vaishali

- Malla (tribe) - Kashi - Bulis

Imperial Magadha

- Brihadratha dynasty - Haryanka dynasty

  - Bimbisara
  - Ajatashatru

- Shishunaga dynasty - Nanda Empire

  - Mahapadma Nanda

- Maurya Empire

  - Chandragupta Maurya
  - Ashoka
Post-Mauryan and Smriti

- Shunga Empire

  - Pushyamitra Shunga

- Kanva dynasty - Development of Smriti - Brahmanical Revival

The Interregnum

- Kushan Influence - Mitra Dynasty - Resurgence of Licchavis

Classical and medieval
The Classical Age

- Gupta Empire

Early Medieval

- Later Gupta dynasty - Maukharis

Pala Era and Feudatories

- Pala Empire - Khayaravala dynasty - Pithipatis of Magadha

Medieval Mithila

- Karnats of Mithila - Oiniwar dynasty

Islamic Incursions

- Delhi Sultanate

Centers of Learning

- Nalanda - Vikramashila - Odantapuri - Telhara monastery

Early-modern
Afghan and Mughal Rule

- Sur Empire

  - Sher Shah Suri

- Mughal Empire

  - Bihar Subah
Regional Chieftaincies

- Chakwars - Chero dynasty - Gidhaur chieftaincy - Kharagpur Raj - Khokhra chieftaincy

Major Zamindari Estates

- Bettiah Raj - Khandavala dynasty - Dumraon Raj - Hathwa Raj - Jagdishpur estate

Colonial & Independence Era
Colonial Rule (1764–1947)

- Battle of Buxar (1764) - East India Company - Permanent Settlement (1793) - Santhal rebellion - Indian Rebellion of 1857

  - Kunwar Singh

- Bihar famine of 1873–74 - Bihar Province (Est. 1912) - 1934 Nepal–Bihar earthquake

Freedom Struggle

- Champaran Satyagraha (1917) - Salt Satyagraha - Bihar Vidyapeeth - Kisan Sabha

  - Swami Sahajanand Saraswati

- Quit India Movement

  - Azad Dasta
Modern Era (Post-1947)
Congress Era (1947–1967)

- Sri Krishna Sinha - Anugrah Narayan Sinha - Zamindari Abolition

Socialist and JP Era (1967–1989)

- Karpoori Thakur - Bihar Movement (1974) - Jayaprakash Narayan - Bhagalpur riots (1989)

RJD Era (1990–2005)

- Lalu Prasad Yadav - Rabri Devi - Fodder Scam

State Division (2000)

- Bihar Reorganisation Act, 2000 - Creation of Jharkhand

NDA Era (2005–Present)

- Nitish Kumar - Politics of Bihar

Culture, art, and society
Art and architecture

- Mahabodhi Temple - Nalanda - Barabar Caves - Tomb of Sher Shah Suri - Rohtas Fort - Golghar - Mithila Painting - Patna Qalam - Manjusha Art - Didarganj Yakshi

Society and language

- Bihari culture - Mithila • Magadh • Anga - Bihari languages

  - Maithili • Magahi
  - Bhojpuri • Angika
Religion

- Religion in Bihar - Buddhism in Bihar - Jainism in Bihar - Islam in Bihar - Sikhism in Bihar

Portal India Portal Bihar

The Gidhaur chieftaincy was a principality which controlled parts of South Bihar for much of the early-modern period. The chieftaincy was ruled by the Chandela clan of the Rajputs and its territory involved present day Jamui district, Deoghar district and part of Munger district.

== Origins ==
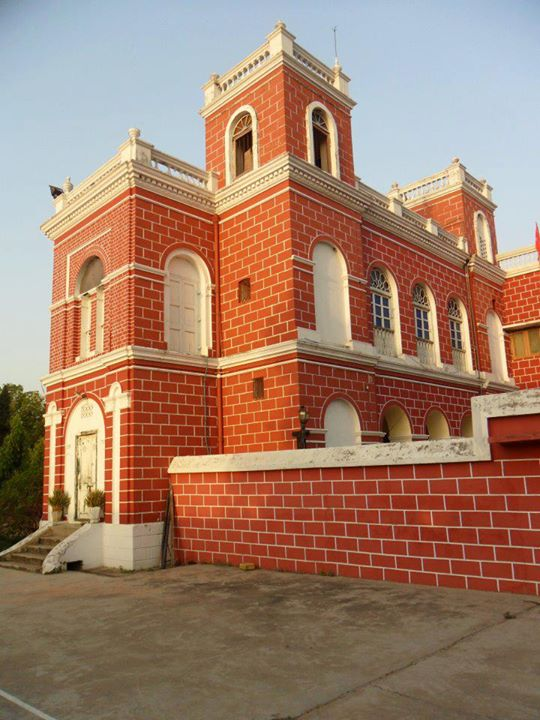
Lalkothi palace which belonged to the Gidhaur estate

The Gidhaur chieftaincy was founded by Bir Bikram Shah who was a Chandel Rajput. The family accounts detail that his family originally held a small chieftaincy in Mahoba in Bundelkhand but were driven out by various foreign incursions including the invasion of Mahmud of Ghazni. From here they arrived in the Rewa area where they established the estate of Bardi. Bir Bikram Shah, who was the younger brother of the chief of Bardi, left his home and arrived in South Bihar where he established his power in the region by defeating the chief, Nagoria in 1262. From here, he continued to expand the extent of his chiefdom.

The Gidhaur chiefs were part of a larger movement of Rajput immigrants into Bihar from the 13th century onwards which included the rulers of Kharagpur Raj and Deo Raj.

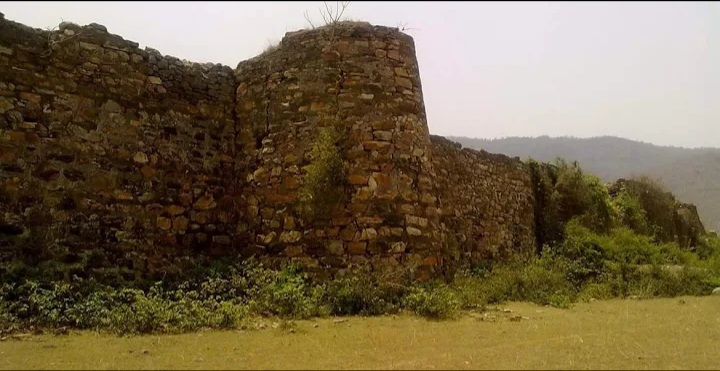
Ruins of Naulakhagarh Fort

The Gidhaur dynasty's first capital may have been the nearby town of Khaira, where there are ruins of an old stone fort. Another prominent ruined fort that probably belonged to the Gidhaur dynasty is Naulakhagarh, a bit southwest of Khaira at the foot of the hills. Although popularly attributed to Akbar or Sher Shah, the Naulakhagarh fort likely was built by the Gidhaur rajas while they were based at Khaira, and Naulakhagarh may have served as a capital as well.

== History ==
=== Mughal period ===
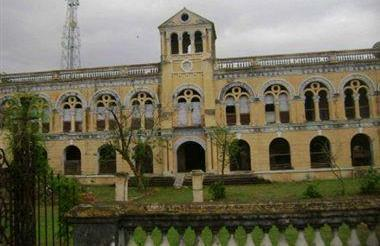
Gidhaur Fort

After Bir Bikram Shah's death in 1339, he was succeeded by various descendants however Raghunath Singh was the first of his descendants to receive much attention in sources from the time. The 16th-century historian, Abbas Sarwani noted that Raghunath Singh accepted the rule of Sher Shah Suri and assisted him in his war against Humayun. Such was Sher Shah's trust in him, that he was even deputed to escort Saif Khan. His son was Bariar Singh who ruled Gidhaur till 1572. After Bariar Singh came Raja Puran Mal who was a contemporary of the Mughal Emperor Akbar. In 1580, Puran Mal joined a rebellion against the imperial authority which was led by Masum Khan Kabuli. Abu Fazl detailed that Puran Mal rescued Masum Khan and his soldiers from Munger where they were trapped by Mughal soldiers. Puran Mal's disloyalty to the Mughals seems to have been temporary however as later sources note that he served with the Mughal commander, Shahbaz Khan Kamboh in an expedition against the Afghans. His son, Hari Singh, was kept as a hostage for the Mughals to ensure his continued compliance with the imperial authority. Puran Mal also engaged in multiple clashes with the neighbouring chief of Kharagpur Raj, Sangram Singh and defeated him. Both the Raja's were known to have a deep enmity.

Puran Mal is also known for constructing the Baidyanath Temple at Deoghar, which happened in 1596. A Sanskrit inscription at the temple refers to him as nṛpati, or "lord of men". Puran Mal's capital was at Lachhuar, west of Gidhaur.

After Pural Mal's death, the principality was divided between his sons Hari Singh and Bishambhar Singh. Because Hari Singh was being kept as a hostage in Delhi, he was absent when Puran Mal died, and Bishambhar Singh had taken charge of ruling the principality in the meantime. The two brothers ended up working out a friendly agreement: Hari Singh would receive territories in parganas Gidhaur and Bishazari, while Bishambhar Singh would keep the rest.

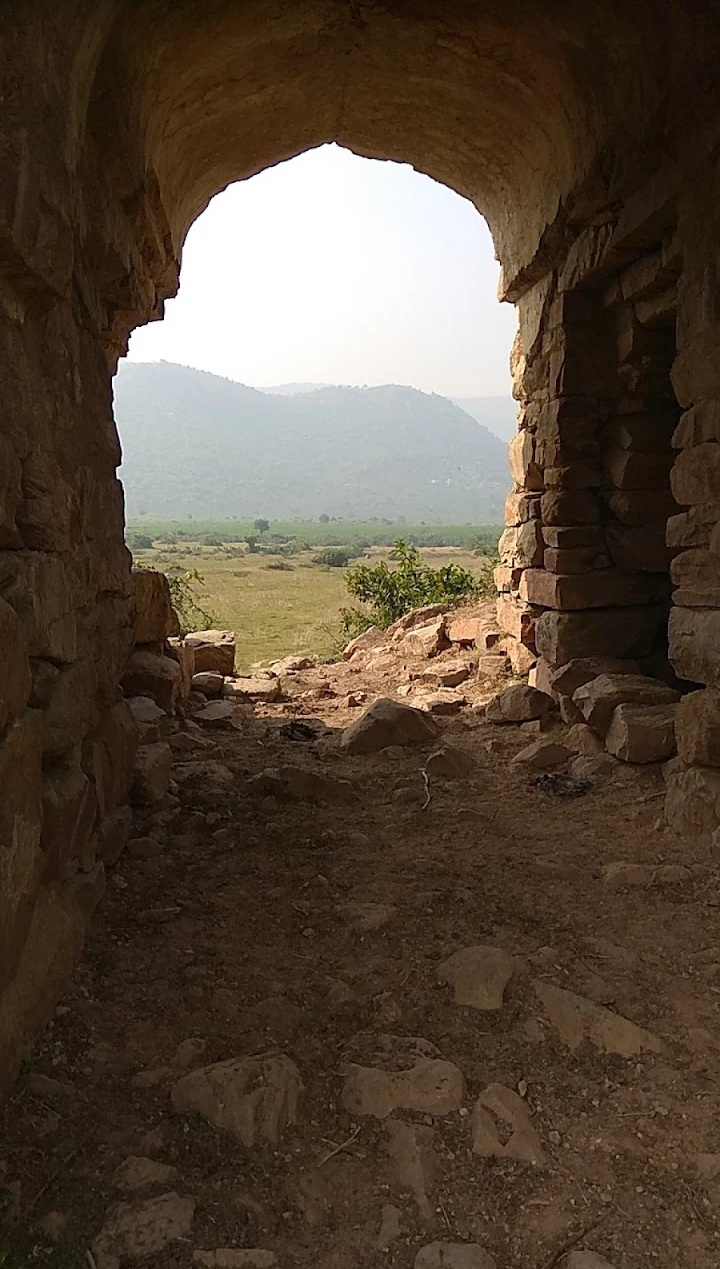
Fort of Naulakhagarh

Hari Singh's descendants were the rajas of Gidhaur, while Bishambhar Singh's descendants were the kumars of Khaira.

Subsequent chiefs of Gidhaur seemed to have maintained their loyalty to the Mughal authorities and supported them in various expeditions. In the war of succession between Dara Shikoh and Shah Shuja in 1658, both princes appealed for the assistance of Raja Dal Singh of Gidhaur who ended up supporting the former.

The rulers of Gidhaur were granted the title of raja in 1651, via a firman (which still exists) issued under Shah Jahan and dated to 21 Rajab, 1068 AH.

=== British period ===
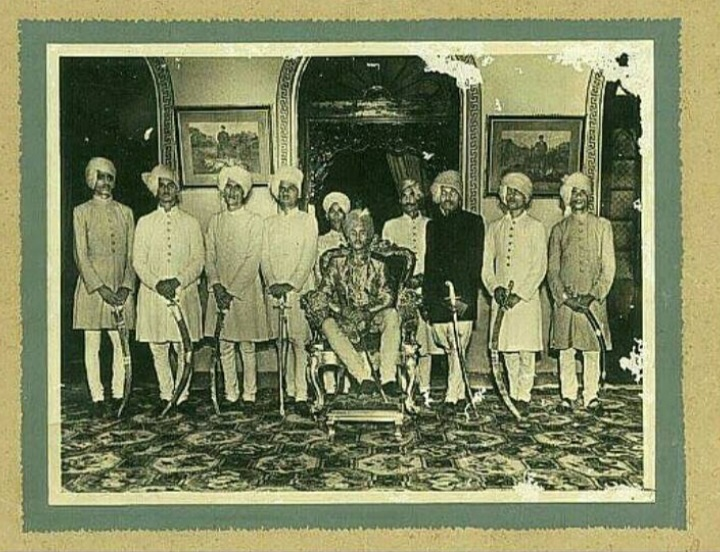
Rajput Courtiers of Maharaja Bahadur of Gidhaur During Durbar

The British East India Company assumed control of the region in the 18th century. By the time when Raja Shyam Singh's elder son Raja Amar Singh sat on the throne, the British rule had started spreading in the country.The Raja supported the Bengal Nawab in the battle of Buxar, as a result his kingdom was seized and a large part of it was settled with the Ghatwals in the form of Ghatwali tenure.According to Bangal District Gazeteer and two reported cases i.e. Gopi Ram Bhotica Vs. Thakur Jagarnath Singh reported in Indian Law Reports 1929(Pat) page 4 and Sukhdeo Singh Vs. Maharaja Bahadur of Gidhaur reported in 1951 AIR 288(SC) it is clear that after seizure of considerable part of estate of Gidhaur, Jagir of Katauna was settled with the family of Gidhaur Raj and two ghatwali taluk i.e. Maheshwari and Dumri were also settled directly to the Chandel Raja of Khaira and Gidhaur due to irresponsible behaviour of their ghatwal. Raja Gopal Singh regained it's estate from British Raj, but with a less area than to their ancestors and in the form of a Zamindari estate. Gidhaur chief, Raja Jai Mangal Singh assisted them during the suppression of Santhal rebellion and the Indian rebellion of 1857. For his services, he was granted the title of Maharaja and made an Knights Commander of the Order of the Star of India in 1865.

== Notable rulers ==
Gidhaur was ruled by the following Rajas after its establishment:

- Bir Bikram Singh - founder of Gidhaur
- Raghunath Singh - ally of Sher Shah Suri
- Raja Puran Mal
- Raja Bisambhar Singh
- Raja Dalar Singh
- Raja Srikrishna Singh 1717
- Raja Praduman Singh (1717–1725)
- Raja Shyam Singh (1725- 1741)
- Raja Amar Singh (1741–1765)
- Raja Bharat Singh(1765–1798)
- Raja Gopal Singh
- Raja Jaswant Singh
- Raja Nawab Singh
- Maharaja Bahadur Jai Mangal Singh
- Maharaja Bahadur Shiv Prasad Singh
- Maharaja Bahadur Ravneshwar Singh
- Maharaja Bahadur Chandramoleshwar Singh
- Maharaja Bahadur Chandrachud Singh
- Maharaja Bahadur Pratap Singh

== See also ==
- Zamindars of Bihar
