= Shreyasi Singh =

Indian sports shooter and politician

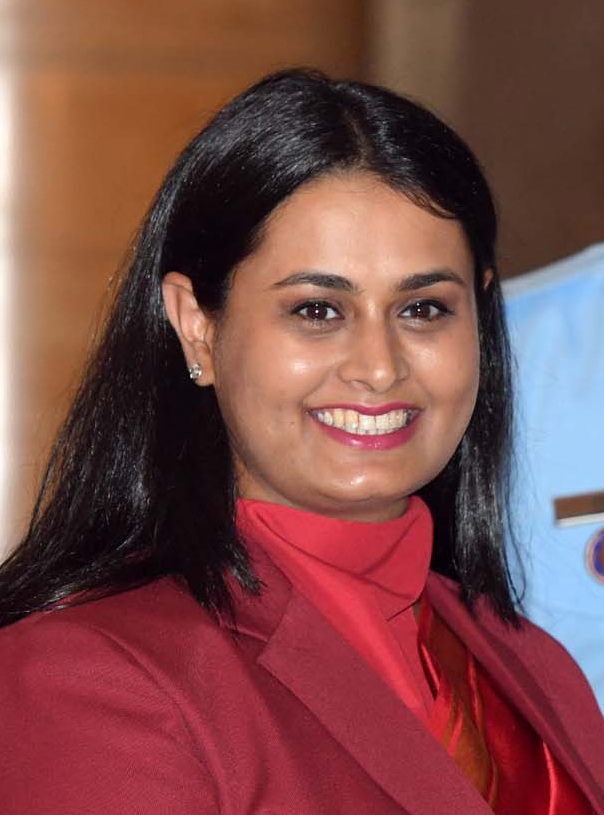

Minister of Industries Government of Bihar
- Incumbent
- Assumed office 07 May 2026
- Chief Minister: Samrat Choudhary
- Preceded by: Samrat Choudhary

Minister of Sports Government of Bihar
- Incumbent
- Assumed office 07 May 2026
- Chief Minister: Samrat Choudhary
- Preceded by: Samrat Choudhary
- In office 20 November 2025 – 15 April 2026
- Chief Minister: Nitish Kumar
- Preceded by: Surendra Mehata
- Succeeded by: Samrat Choudhary (as Chief Minister)

Minister of Information Technology Government of Bihar
- In office 20 November 2025 – 15 April 2026
- Chief Minister: Nitish Kumar
- Preceded by: Krishna Kumar Mantoo
- Succeeded by: Samrat Choudhary (as Chief Minister)

Member of Bihar Legislative Assembly
- Incumbent
- Assumed office 10 November 2020
- Preceded by: Vijay Prakash Yadav
- Constituency: Jamui

Personal details
- Born: 29 August 1991 (age 35) Gidhaur, Bihar, India
- Party: Bharatiya Janata Party (2020–present)
- Parent(s): Digvijay Singh (father); Putul Kumari (mother)
- Sports career
- Nickname: Shreya
- Country: India
- Sport: Shooting
- Event: Double Trap
Medal record
Women's shooting
Representing India
Asian Games
Bronze medal – third place	2014 Incheon	Double trap team
Asian Championships
Gold medal – first place	2012 Patiala	Trap team
Gold medal – first place	2014 Al-Ain	Trap team
Gold medal – first place	2016 Abu Dhabi	Trap team
Silver medal – second place	2011 Kuala Lumpur	Trap team
Silver medal – second place	2013 Almaty	Trap team
Silver medal – second place	2024 Kuwait City	Trap team
Commonwealth Games
Silver medal – second place	2014 Glasgow	Double trap
Gold medal – first place	2018 Gold Coast	Double trap
Commonwealth Championships
Silver medal – second place	2010 Delhi	Trap
Silver medal – second place	2017 Brisbane	Double trap
- Updated on 11 April 2018

Shreyasi Singh (born 29 August 1991) is an Indian sports shooter and politician. She competes in the double trap event. She won a gold medal in the Shooting at the 2018 Commonwealth Games in Gold Coast, Australia - Women's double trap and a silver medal at the 2014 Commonwealth Games in Glasgow, Scotland. In 2020, she joined the Bharatiya Janata Party and is a Member of Bihar Legislative Assembly from Jamui constituency. She is currently serving as the Sports and Industries Minister of Bihar. She also previously served as Information Technology Minister of Bihar.

== Early life and education ==
Shreyasi's grandfather Kumar Surendra Singh and father Digvijay Singh were both presidents of the National Rifle Association of India in their lifetimes. Shreyasi hails from Gidhaur in Jamui district of Bihar. Her father was also former union minister. Her mother Putul Kumari is also an ex-MP from Banka, Bihar. Shreyasi studied arts at Hansraj College, Delhi and completed an MBA at Manav Rachna International University, Faridabad.

== Sports career ==
Singh was part of the Indian team at the 2013 Trap Shooting World Cup held in Acapulco, Mexico. She finished in 15th position there.

Singh competed in the singles and pair trap events at the 2010 Commonwealth Games in Delhi. She came 6th in single trap event and 5th in pair trap event. She won the silver medal in the singles double trap event at the 2014 Commonwealth Games in Glasgow having scored 92 points in the final. In the same year, she won the bronze medal at the 2014 Asian Games in Incheon in the Double trap team event, along with Shagun Chowdhary and Varsha Varman. She won gold medal in 61st National Shooting Championship while representing Bihar, in 2017.

== Political career ==
At the age of 29, she joined the Bharatiya Janata Party in 2020 and successfully contested the 2020 Bihar Legislative Assembly election from Jamui (Vidhan Sabha constituency), defeating the RJD's Vijay Prakash with a margin of over 41,000 votes.

At the age of 34, She won the Bihar Legislative Assembly election with the highest margin of 54,498 votes from Jamui constituencies. On 20 November 2025, she became the cabinet minister in the Bihar government. On 22 November 2025, she was appointed the Sports and IT minister in the Government of Bihar.
