= Jamui Assembly constituency =

Assembly constituency in Bihar, India

Coordinates: 24.93°N 86.22°E

- Constituency No. 241 for the Bihar Legislative Assembly

Constituency details
- Country: India
- Region: East India
- State: Bihar
- District: Jamui
- Lok Sabha constituency: Jamui
- Established: 1957
- Total electors: 313,053

Member of Legislative Assembly
- 18th Bihar Legislative Assembly
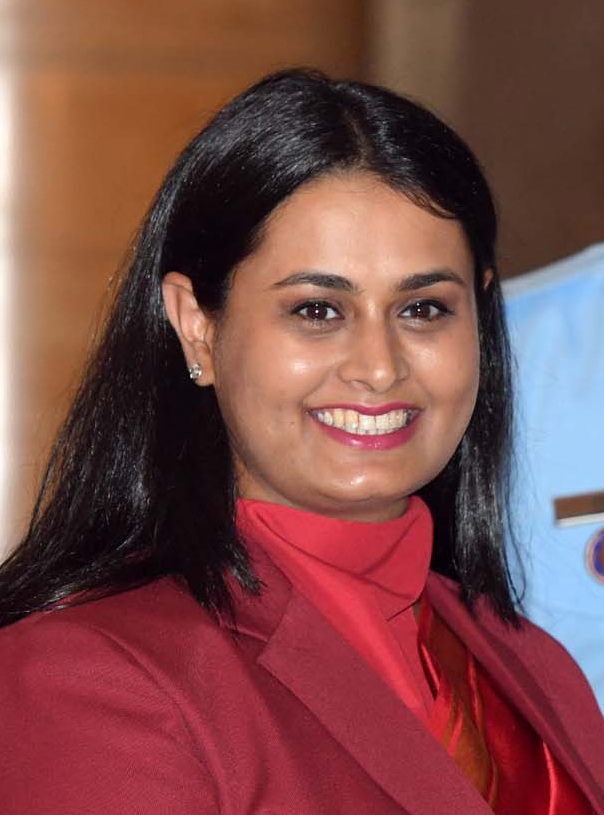
- Incumbent Shreyashi Singh; Sports and Industries Minister of Bihar
- Party: BJP
- Alliance: NDA
- Elected year: 2025
- Preceded by: Vijay Prakash Yadav, RJD

Jamui Assembly constituency is an assembly constituency in Bihar Legislative Assembly, located in Jamui district of Bihar, India. It is a segment of Jamui (Lok Sabha constituency).

== Members of the Legislative Assembly ==
Year	Name	Party
1957	Hari Prasad Sharma	Indian National Congress
1957	Bhola Manjhi	Communist Party of India
1962	Anil Kumar	Indian National Congress
1967	Tripurari Prasad Singh	Praja Socialist Party
1969	Tripurari Prasad Singh	Praja Socialist Party
1972	Tripurari Prasad Singh	Samyukta Socialist Party
1977	Tripurari Prasad Singh	Janata Party
1980	Hardeo Prasad	Independent
1985	Sushil Kumar Singh	Indian National Congress
1990	Sushil Kumar Singh	Indian National Congress
1995	Arjun Mandal	Janata Dal
2000	Narendra Singh	Janata Dal (United)
2000^	Sushil Kumar Singh	Janata Dal (United)
2005	Vijay Prakash Yadav	Rashtriya Janata Dal
2005	Abhay Singh	Janata Dal (United)
2010	Ajay Pratap	Janata Dal (United)
2015	Vijay Prakash Yadav	Rashtriya Janata Dal
2020	Shreyasi Singh	Bharatiya Janata Party
2025	Shreyasi Singh	Bharatiya Janata Party

== Election results ==
=== 2025 ===
Detailed Results at: https://results.eci.gov.in/ResultAcGenNov2025/ConstituencywiseS04241.htm

Bihar Assembly election, 2025: Jamui
Party	Candidate	Votes	%	±%
BJP	Shreyasi Singh	123,868	57.02	▲13.13
RJD	Mohammad Shamsad Alam	69,370	31.93	▲10.67
JSP	Anil Prasad Sah	5,905	2.72	
Independent	Amrendra Alias Khokhan Singh	4,982	2.29	
Independent	Santosh Kumar Yadav	2,528	1.16	
NOTA	None of the above	2,687	1.24	▼0.39
Majority		54,498	25.09	▲2.46
Turnout		217,247	69.4	▲7.96
BJP hold		Swing		

=== 2020 ===
Bihar Assembly election, 2020: Jamui
Party	Candidate	Votes	%	±%
BJP	Shreyasi Singh	79,603	43.89	▲6.88
RJD	Vijay Prakash Yadav	38,554	21.26	▼20.98
JAP(L)	Mohammad Shamsad Alam	17,800	9.81	
Independent	Sujata Singh	17,502	9.65	
RLSP	Ajay Pratap	15,712	8.66	
Independent	Ramavatar Kumar Chandravanshi	3,595	1.98	
NOTA	None of the above	2,955	1.63	▲0.38
Majority		41,049	22.63	▲17.4
Turnout		181,364	61.44	▲4.96
BJP gain from RJD		Swing		

=== 2015 ===
2015 Bihar Legislative Assembly election: Jamui
Party	Candidate	Votes	%	±%
RJD	Vijay Prakash Yadav	66,577	42.24	
BJP	Ajoy Pratap	58,328	37.01	
Independent	Rabindra Kumar Mandal	8,267	5.24	
Independent	Anil Kumar Singh	4,094	2.6	
Independent	Sanjit Panbay	3,925	2.49	
Independent	Dharamvir Bhadoria	2,941	1.87	
Independent	Mahavir Yadav	2,369	1.5	
CPI	Rupesh Kumar Singh	1,975	1.25	
BSP	Pramod Kumar Mandal	1,662	1.05	
SP	Md. Abdul Baki	1,545	0.98	
NOTA	None of the above	1,975	1.25	
Majority		8,249	5.23	
Turnout		157,621	56.48	

=== 1985 ===
- Rameshwer Singh (INC): 12,056 votes
- Bhola Manjhi (CPI): 7,714 votes
