= Nikki Hembrom =

Indian politician (born 1978)

Nikki hembrom

Bihar Legislative Assembly
- In office 2020–2025
- Preceded by: Sweety Sima Hembram
- Succeeded by: Puran Lal Tudu
- Constituency: Katoria

Personal details
- Party: Bharatiya Janata Party

Nikki Hembrom (born 1978) is an Indian politician from Bihar. She is a member of the Bihar Legislative Assembly from Katoria Assembly constituency which is reserved for Scheduled Tribe community in Banka district representing the Bharatiya Janata Party. She was elected in the 2020 Bihar Legislative Assembly election.

== Early life and education ==
Hembrom is from Belhar, Banka district. Her husband Ramesh Hembrom is a businessman. Together, they have a son, Sonalal Hembrom. She completed her doctorate in 2012 and earned her Ph.D. at Sido Kanhu Murmu University, Dumka. She declared assets worth Rs.1 crore in the affidavit filed to the Election Commission of India before the general election. She has no criminal cases against her.

== Career ==
Hembrom won the 2020 Bihar Legislative Assembly election from Katoria Assembly constituency representing the Bharatiya Janata Party. She polled 74,785 votes and defeated her nearest rival, Sweety Sima Hembram of the Rashtriya Janata Dal, by a margin of 6,421 votes. She fights for the rights of the tribal people. In the 2015 Bihar Legislative Assembly election, she contested on the BJP ticket for the first time but lost to the same candidate, Sweety Sima. In 2015, she polled 44,423 votes against Sima, who got 54,762 and won by a margin of 10,339 votes.

=== Accident ===
On 1 July 2025, she was involved in a road accident when their car hit a tree. The MLA was and her driver were injured along with three other security guards who were escorting her in a vehicle behind her car. After finishing a programme in Bhaljor, she was returning to Bausi. At the Hechala turn, near Shyambazar, the vehicle overturned after hitting a tree, and four guards in the vehicle behind them were injured and treated at a local hospital.

In June 2023, her son Sonalal Hembrom died of brain hemorrhage.
