= Shakuntala Devi (politician) =

Indian politician (1931–2022)

Member of Parliament, Lok Sabha
- In office 1957–1967
- Succeeded by: B.S. Sharma
- Constituency: Banka, Bihar

Personal details
- Born: 10 October 1931 Sangrampur, Bihar, British Raj
- Died: 9 January 2022 (aged 90) Patna, Bihar, India
- Party: Indian National Congress

Shakuntala Devi (10 October 1931 – 9 January 2022) was an Indian politician.

== Biography ==
She was a Member of Parliament, representing Banka, Bihar in the Lok Sabha the lower house of India's Parliament as a member of the Indian National Congress. Devi died in Patna on 9 January 2022, at the age of 90.
