= Siyaram Rai =

Member of the Bihar Legislative Assembly
- In office 1985–1990
- Preceded by: Chandra Mauleshwar Singh
- Succeeded by: Chandra Mauleshwar Singh
- Constituency: Belhar

Personal details
- Born: 2 June 1929 Pipra, Bhagalpur district, British India
- Died: 22 February 2020 (aged 90) Banka district, Bihar
- Party: Indian National Congress
- Parent: Babu Nawal Kishore Rai

Siyaram Rai was an Indian politician from Bihar. He was elected from Belhar assembly constituency in 1985.

== Biography ==
Siyaram Rai was born to Babu Nawal Kishore Rai, landlord of Pipra in Banka district of Bihar. In 1985, He contested and won the Belhar assembly seat on a Congress ticket.
