= Gidhaur railway station =

Railway station in Gidhaur, India

GIDHAUR

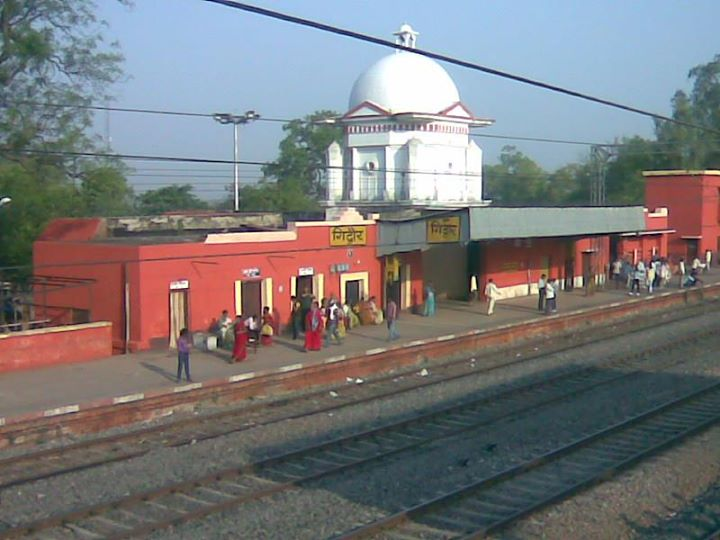
- Gidhaur station seen from foot overbridge

General information
- Location: Gidhaur, Jamui district, Bihar; India
- Coordinates: 24.856651°N 86.324201°E
- Elevation: 104 metres (341 ft)
- System: Indian Railways station
- Owner: Indian Railways
- Operator: East Central Railway
- Lines: Howrah–Delhi main line Asansol–Patna section
- Platforms: 2
- Tracks: Broad gauge

Construction
- Structure type: At-grade

Other information
- Status: Active
- Station code: GHR
- Zone(s): East Central Railway
- Division(s): Danapur
- Classification: NSG-5

History
- Former names: East Indian Railway
Route map
Location
- Location within Bihar

Gidhaur railway station (station code: GHR), is a small railway station serving the town of Gidhaur in Jamui district in the Indian state of Bihar. It operates under Danapur railway division of East Central Railway zone of Indian Railways and lies on the Howrah-Delhi main line via Patna.

== Infrastructure ==
Gidhaur railway station has basic infrastructure common to small Indian stations. It features two platforms connected through a foot over bridge, with sheltered waiting areas and ticket booking counters. The station is equipped with a public announcement system and has a road access connecting the nearby villages.

== Trains and Services ==
The station primarily serves passenger trains and MEMU services, with a few express trains halting at Gidhaur. Local passenger trains connect the station to nearby towns such as Patna, Jamui, Jasidih and Kiul.
