= Jay Prakash Narayan Yadav =

Indian politician

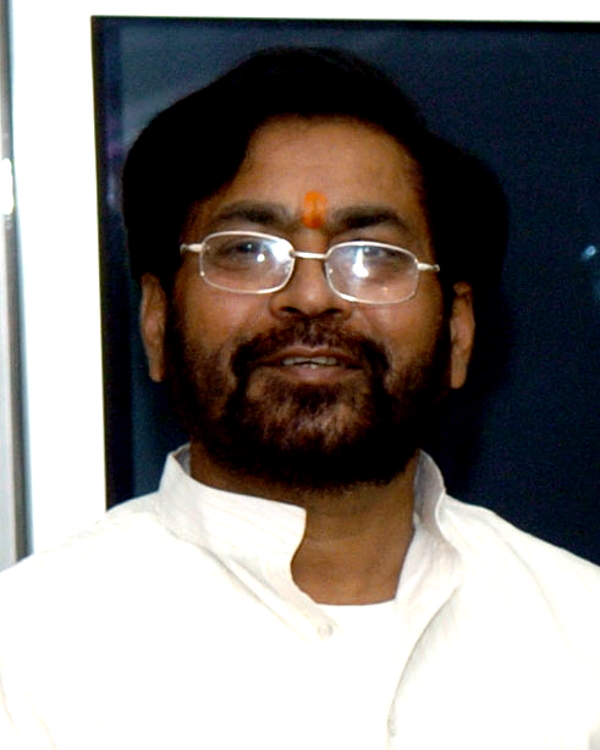

Minister of State for Water Resources
- In office 23 May 2004 – 6 November 2005
- Prime Minister: Manmohan Singh
- Preceded by: Bijoya Chakravarty
- Succeeded by: Himself
- In office 24 October 2006 – 22 May 2009
- Prime Minister: Manmohan Singh
- Preceded by: Himself
- Succeeded by: Vincent Pala

Member of Parliament, Lok Sabha
- In office 13 May 2004 – 16 May 2009
- Preceded by: Brahmanand Mandal
- Succeeded by: Rajiv Ranjan Singh
- Constituency: Munger
- In office 16 May 2014 – 23 May 2019
- Preceded by: Putul Kumari
- Succeeded by: Giridhari Yadav
- Constituency: Banka

Personal details
- Born: 2 August 1954 (age 71) Jamui, Bihar, India
- Party: Rashtriya Janata Dal
- Spouse: Savita Yadav
- Children: 2 daughters
- Website: www.rashtriyajanatadal.com
- As of 26 September, 2006

Jay Prakash Narayan Yadav (born 2 August 1954) is an Indian politician from Bihar. He served as the Minister of State of Water Resources during UPA I under then Prime Minister Manmohan Singh. He was a member of the 14th Lok Sabha of India. Yadav represented the Munger constituency of Bihar and is a member of the Rashtriya Janata Dal (RJD) political party. He won the 2014 Indian general election from Banka Constituency and in 2019 and 2024 lost to Giridhari Yadav from the same constituency.

== Biography ==
Jai Prakash Narayan Yadav was born in Barhat, Jamui district, in Bihar state. His late father's name is Akhileshwar Prasad Yadav and his mother's name is Shanti Devi. Yadav holds a degree of Masters of Arts and Bachelor of Law from Patna University, Bihar. He married Savita Yadav on 18 February 1991. They have two daughters, elder Divya Prakash and younger Shefali Roy.

== Political tenure ==
- 1980-1985 and 1990-2004 - Member, Bihar Legislative Assembly (four terms)
- 1995-2000 - Minister, Primary, Secondary and Adult Education, Government of Bihar
- 2000-2004 - Minister, Micro-irrigation, Government of Bihar
- 2004-2009 - State Minister, water resources, Government of India and Lok Sabha member from Munger constituency
- 2014-2019 - Lok Sabha member from Banka constituency
