= Manoj Yadav (politician) =

Indian politician

Member of the Bihar Legislative Assembly
- Incumbent
- Assumed office 10 November 2020
- Preceded by: Ramdeo Yadav
- Constituency: Belhar

Personal details
- Born: June 9, 1975 (age 51)
- Party: Janata Dal (United)
- Education: 12th Pass from Mahant Ayodhya Yadav College, Bhagarlpur University in 1992
- Occupation: Politician

Manoj Yadav is an Indian politician who was elected as a member of Bihar Legislative Assembly from Belhar constituency in 2020 as candidate of Janata Dal (United). He defeated three time MLA, Ramdeo Yadav of Rashtriya Janata Dal in the 2020 elections.

== See also ==
- Belhar Assembly constituency
