= Gidhaur, Bihar =

Gidhaur
- Small Town
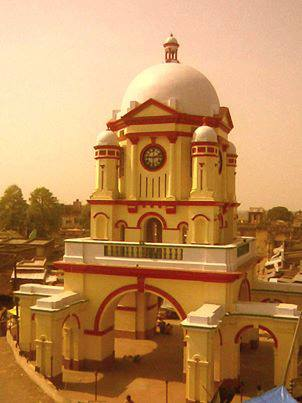
- Minto Tower

- Location in Bihar, India
- Coordinates: 24.857941°N 86.300369°E
- Country: India
- State: Bihar
- Region: Angika
- Division: Munger
- District: Jamui
- Elevation: 26 m (85 ft)

Population (2011)
  - Total: 9,353
- Demonym: Gidhauriya

Languages
  - Official: Hindi, Angika, Maithili Urdu
- Time zone: UTC+5:30 (IST)
- PIN: 811305
- Telephone code: 06345
- Vehicle registration: BR46
- Sex ratio: 910/1000(2011) ♂/♀
- Lok Sabha constituency: Jamui
- Vidhan Sabha constituency: Jhajha

Gidhaur (also known as Patsanda) is a small town in the Jamui District of Bihar. In the early-modern period, it was the centre of the Gidhaur chieftaincy.

== History ==
Raja Bir Bikram Shah who belonged to Chandel Rajput Dynasty founded this princely state in 1262 AD, after defeating the local leader Nagoria. From here he started to expand his kingdom. He was the younger brother of Raja of Bardi From Singrauli. The Chandel Rajput rulers ruled over Gidhaur for more than six centuries. Raja Puran Mal, ninth in descent of this dynasty is said to have built the Baidyanath Dham temple at Deoghar in 1596.

== Geography ==
Gidhaur is located at the bank of river Ulai, 167 kilometres south-east of state capital, Patna. It is situated at (24°52′0″N 86°19′0″E) about 19 kilometers east from the district headquarters Jamui.

Ulai is a monsoon river which flows parallel to the town and makes southern-western boundary. There are two hill Seva-Pahar and Bandhora-pahar in the direction of north and south of town.

The population is equally distributed around Minto tower. The town can be divided into eastern part (Jhajha side) and western side (Jamui side) in a way to categorize different local positions.

== Demographics ==
The Patsanda village has a population of 9353, of which 4897 are males and 4456 are females, as per Population Census 2011. In Patsanda village population of children with age 0–6 is 1617 which makes up 17.29% of total population of village. The average sex ratio of Patsanda village is 910, which is lower than the Bihar state average of 918. The child sex ratio for the Patsanda as per census is 1011, higher than the Bihar average of 935. Patsanda village has a higher literacy rate than Bihar. In 2011, the literacy rate of Patsanda village was 67.72% compared to 61.80% in Bihar. In Patsanda the male literacy was 79.53% while the female literacy rate was 54.46%.

== Gidhaur Block ==
The geographical area of Gidhaur Block is 71.11 km^{2}. Its population was 60,670 according to the census of 2011. There are twenty villages in Gidhaur block.

- Bandhaura
- Gangra
- Kharhua
- Mahuli
- Ratanpur

- Banjhulia
- Genadih
- Kolhua
- Maura
- Sansarpur

- Chhatarpur
- Guguldih
- Kumardih
- Nayagaon
- Sewa

- Dhobghat
- Ketru Nawada
- Kundhur
- Patsanda
- Simaria
- Tardih
- Sohjana

== Economy ==
All the business premises are located in Gidhaur Bazaar centered around Minto tower. Earlier Local business shops were mainly in Tower chowk but now it is widely distributed. Most of the people depend on agriculture and small scale business for their livelihood.

== Transportation ==
=== Rail ===
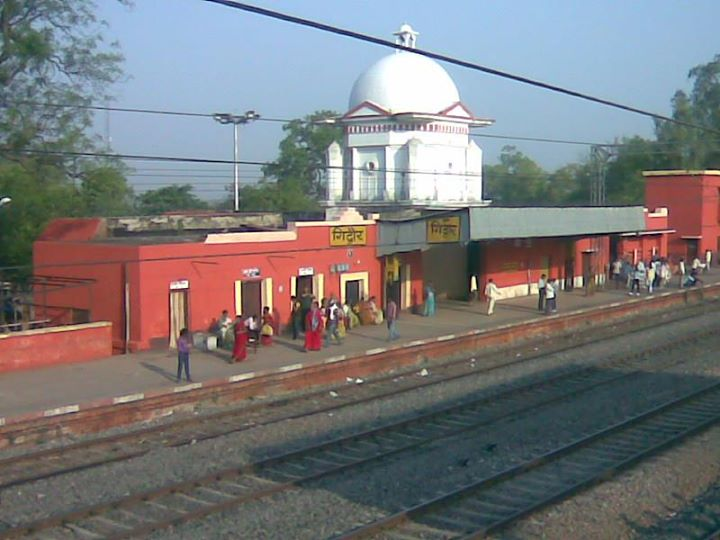
Gidhaur railway station

Gidhaur lies on the Howrah–Delhi main line section of East Central Railway of Danapur Division The Gidhaur railway station (station code: GHR) is 2 kilometers away from the center of town. Presently, ten express train and eight passenger train stops here. The railway station can be reached by auto-rickshaw and tumtum (horse-cart). Jhajha, a major railway station, connects Gidhaur to across the country.

=== Road ===
State Highway SH-18 passes through Gidhaur main market alongside Minto tower, connecting it to district headquarters Jamui and nearby major railway station Jhajha. The condition of the road has dramatically improved in last 5 years.

Ulai river bridge connects southern smaller villages to the town.

=== Air ===
There is a small helipad at Surendra Singh stadium which is used to land small helicopters.

== Climate ==
Gidhaur has a humid subtropical climate with extremely hot summers from late March to early June, the monsoon season from late June to late September and a mild winter from November to February. In summer, Temperature rises to 45 °C and in winter It goes down to 5 °C. The table below details historical monthly averages for climate variables.

Climate data for Gidhaur
Month	Jan	Feb	Mar	Apr	May	Jun	Jul	Aug	Sep	Oct	Nov	Dec	Year
Mean daily maximum °C (°F)	23 (73)	26.1 (79.0)	32.4 (90.3)	37.4 (99.3)	38.4 (101.1)	36.7 (98.1)	32.9 (91.2)	32.5 (90.5)	32.2 (90.0)	31.7 (89.1)	28.9 (84.0)	24.6 (76.3)	31.4 (88.5)
Mean daily minimum °C (°F)	9.3 (48.7)	11.6 (52.9)	16.4 (61.5)	22.1 (71.8)	25.1 (77.2)	26.7 (80.1)	26.1 (79.0)	26.1 (79.0)	25.3 (77.5)	21.6 (70.9)	14.8 (58.6)	10.1 (50.2)	19.6 (67.3)
Average precipitation mm (inches)	20.4 (0.80)	11.1 (0.44)	11.4 (0.45)	9 (0.4)	35.6 (1.40)	141 (5.6)	319.2 (12.57)	279.3 (11.00)	212.6 (8.37)	72.3 (2.85)	8.2 (0.32)	7.4 (0.29)	1,127.5 (44.49)
Source: worldweather.org

== Demographics ==
Total population of Gidhaur town is 7453 according to census of 2011. The male population is 4013 and the female population is 3440.

== Culture ==
=== Festivals ===
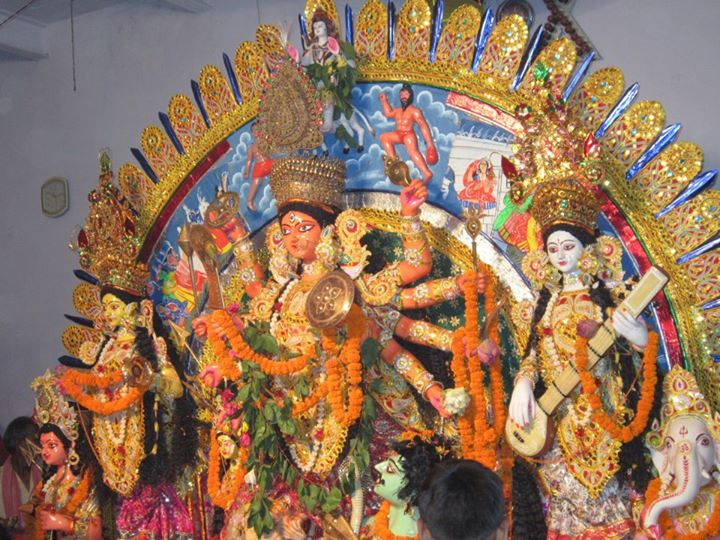
Durga Maa

Durga-puja of Gidhaur is very famous. It is celebrated with much fun-fare and religious way. A folk-line related to Durga-puja of Gidhaur is Kali hai kalkatte ki, Durga hai patsande ki, describes the popularity of it. Thousands of people visit Durga mandir in Navratri.

Laxmi Puja is celebrated after the fifth day of Dasami (the last day of Navratri). A month-long mela is held adjacent to Durga mandir to facilitate rural entertainment. A large variety of trees are sold, making this festival very environmentally friendly.

In addition to it, Holi, Diwali, Chhath puja, Eid, Muharram, and Ramnavmi are widely celebrated.

== Sports ==
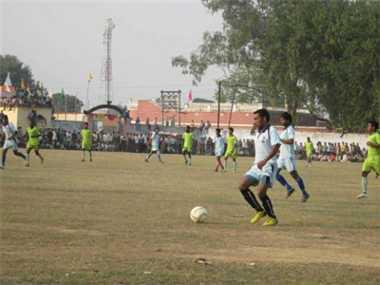
Gidhaur stadium

Football is very popular and is played daily in Kumar Surendra Singh Stadium. Every year a major football tournament is organised. Cricket is also played by most children. There is a regional center of sports authority of India, where sportspersons train for athletics, volleyball, basketball, football etc.

Maharaja of Gidhaur Chandrachud Singh was a member of Bihar cricket team in one-day match played at Keenan Stadium Jamshedpur against English team Lord Tennyson's XI on 29 December 1937.

== Major public places ==
It is one of the few towns of district Jamui where basic governmental facilities like hospital, higher secondary school, public library, post office, police station, block office, stadium, and town hall are available.

=== Religious sites ===
- Budanath mandir
- Kali maa mandir
- Panchmandir
- Mosque
- Durga mandir
- Hanuman mandir
- Macchendranath Hill
- Ratanpur Hill (Ratan Garh)
- Braham Baba, Sewa
- Kokilchand Baba, Gangra

== Notable inhabitants ==
- Maharaja Bahadur Pratap Singhji (1935–2012) Former member of parliament, Banka (Bihar)
- Digvijay Singh, (1955–2010) Ex-Union Minister
- Putul Kumari, Ex-MP Banka (W/o Digvijay Singh)
- Shreyasi Singh, Indian double trap shooter, gold medal winner, Member of Legislative Assembly, Jamui-241 (Bihar)
