= Sweety Sima Hembram =

Indian politician

Bihar Legislative Assembly
- In office 2015–2020
- Preceded by: Sonelal Hembram
- Succeeded by: Nikki Hembrom
- Constituency: Katoria

Personal details
- Party: Rashtriya Janata Dal

Sweety Sima Hembram is an Indian politician currently serving as a Member of the Legislative Assembly from the Katoria seat in Bihar representing the Rashtriya Janata Dal. Hembram won her seat in the 2015 Bihar Legislative Assembly election, becoming one of 28 women MLAs.
