= Amarpur, Bihar Assembly constituency =

Constituency of the Bihar legislative assembly in India

Coordinates: 25.04°N 86.90°E

- Constituency No. 159 for the Bihar Legislative Assembly

Constituency details
- Country: India
- Region: East India
- State: Bihar
- District: Banka
- Established: 1957
- Total electors: 298,837

Member of Legislative Assembly
- 18th Bihar Legislative Assembly
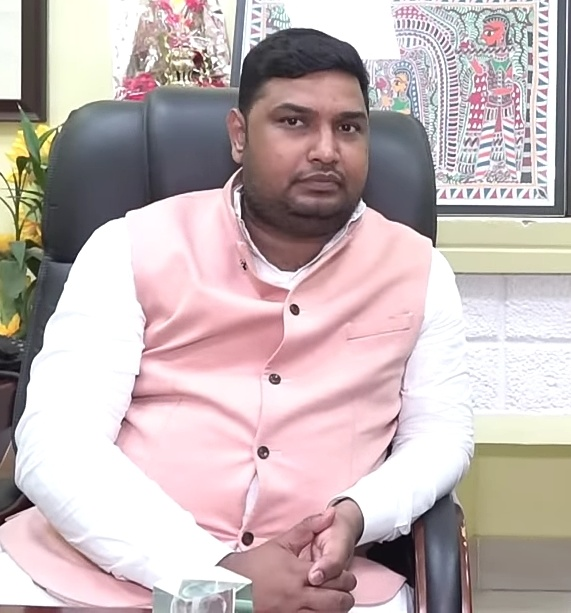
- Incumbent Jayant Raj Kushwaha; Ex Minister, Government of Bihar
- Party: JD(U)
- Alliance: NDA
- Elected year: 2020
- Preceded by: Janardan Manjhi; JD(U)

.

Amarpur Assembly constituency is one of 243 constituencies of legislative assembly of Bihar. It is part of Banka Lok Sabha constituency along with other assembly constituencies viz. Dhoraiya, Katoria, Belhar and Banka. The current MLA is Jayant Raj Kushwaha of Janata Dal (United).

== Overview ==
Amarpur comprises CD Blocks Shambhuganj & Amarpur.

== Members of Legislative Assembly ==
Year	Member	Party
1957	Shital Prasad Bhagat	Indian National Congress
1962	Shital Prasad Bhagat	Indian National Congress
1967	Sukhnarain Singh	Samyukta Socialist Party
1969	Sukhnarain Singh	Samyukta Socialist Party
1972	Janardan Yadav	Bharatiya Jana Sangh
1977	Janardan Yadav	Janata Party
1980	Neel Mohan Singh	Indian National Congress
1985	Neel Mohan Singh	Indian National Congress
1990	Madhav Mandal	Independent politician
1995	Surendra Prasad Singh	Janata Dal
2000	Surendra Prasad Singh	Rashtriya Janata Dal
2005	Surendra Prasad Singh	Rashtriya Janata Dal
2005	Surendra Prasad Singh	Rashtriya Janata Dal
2010	Janardan Manjhi	Janata Dal (United)
2015	Janardan Manjhi	Janata Dal (United)
2020	Jayant Raj Kushwaha	Janata Dal (United)
2025	Jayant Raj Kushwaha	Janata Dal (United)

== Election results ==
=== 2025 ===
2025 Bihar Legislative Assembly election
Party	Candidate	Votes	%	±%
JD(U)	Jayant Raj Kushwaha	103,944	53.51	+20.38
INC	Jitendra Singh	70,723	36.41	+5.18
JSP	Sujata Vaidya	4,789	2.47	
Independent	Ritesh Kumar Jha	2,406	1.24	
AAP	Md Zakir Hossain	2,221	1.14	
NOTA	None of the above	6,017	3.1	+0.94
Majority		33,221	17.1	+15.2
Turnout		194,247	65.0	+9.54
JD(U) hold		Swing		

=== 2020 ===
2020 Bihar Legislative Assembly election
Party	Candidate	Votes	%	±%
JD(U)	Jayant Raj Kushwaha	54,308	33.13	−14.76
INC	Jitendra Singh	51,194	31.23	
LJP	Mrinal Shekhar	40,308	24.59	
Independent	Pravin Kumar Jha	2,125	1.3	
NCP	Anil Kumar Singh	2,096	1.28	
Independent	Krishana Mohan Thakur	2,089	1.27	
Independent	Bipin Kishor Ray	1,923	1.17	
RRP	Ashok Kumar	1,720	1.05	
NOTA	None of the above	3,534	2.16	−2.27
Majority		3,114	1.9	−5.75
Turnout		163,933	55.46	−0.14
JD(U) hold		Swing		

=== 2015 ===
2015 Bihar Legislative Assembly election
Party	Candidate	Votes	%	±%
JD(U)	Janardan Manjhi	73,707	47.89	
BJP	Mrinal Shekhar	61,934	40.24	
Independent	Surendra Prasad Singh	2,864	1.86	
Independent	Suryadeo Singh	2,134	1.39	
NOTA	None of the above	6,818	4.43	
Majority		11,773	7.65	
Turnout		153,925	55.6	

=== 2010 ===
2010 Bihar legislative assembly election
Party	Candidate	Votes	%	±%
JD(U)	Janardan Manjhi	47300	40.78	
RJD	Surendra Prasad Singh	29293	25.25	

=== 2005 ===
2005 Feb Bihar legislative assembly election
Party	Candidate	Votes	%	±%
RJD	Surendra Prasad Singh	31428	28.76%	
JD(U)	Bedanand Singh	25109	22.97%	

=== 2000 ===
2000 Bihar legislative assembly election
Party	Candidate	Votes	%	±%
RJD	Surendra Prasad Singh	49144	42.11%	
INC	Nawal Kishore Choudhary	42,678	36.57%	
