= Manorama Singh =

Indian politician (1938–2024)

Member of Parliament, Lok Sabha
- In office 1984–1985
- Preceded by: Chandrashekhar Singh
- Succeeded by: Chandrashekhar Singh
- Constituency: Banka (Bihar)
- In office 1986–1989
- Preceded by: Chandrashekhar Singh
- Succeeded by: Pratap Singh
- Constituency: Banka (Bihar)

Personal details
- Born: 23 August 1938 Kalyanpur, Monghyr District, Bihar Province, British India
- Died: 8 December 2024 (aged 86) Patna, Bihar, India
- Party: Indian National Congress
- Spouse: Chandrashekhar Singh

Manorama Singh (23 August 1938 – 8 December 2024) was an Indian politician. Her late husband Chandrashekhar Singh served as Chief Minister of Bihar. She was elected to the Lok Sabha from the Banka in Bihar as a member of the Indian National Congress in the 1980s.

Singh was elected to Lok Sabha from Banka in 1984, but vacated the seat when her husband was made minister in Delhi in 1985. Her husband died in 1986, and one more by-poll had to be held in 1986. She won 1986 Banka by-election against George Fernandes of Janata Party with 186,237 votes against 156,853 votes. She lost election from Banka as Congress candidate in 1989, 1991, and 1996.

Singh died in Patna, Bihar on 8 December 2024, at the age of 86.
