= Belhar Assembly constituency =

Constituency of the Bihar legislative assembly in India

Coordinates: 24.92°N 86.60°E

Belhar
- Constituency No. 163 for the Bihar Legislative Assembly

Constituency details
- Country: India
- Region: East India
- State: Bihar
- District: Banka
- Established: 1962
- Total electors: 319,717

Member of Legislative Assembly
- 18th Bihar Legislative Assembly
- Incumbent Manoj Yadav
- Party: JD(U)
- Alliance: NDA
- Elected year: 2025

Belhar is one of 243 constituencies of legislative assembly of Bihar. It is part of Banka Lok Sabha constituency along with other assembly constituencies viz. Amarpur, Banka, Katoria and Dhoraiya.

== Overview ==
Belhar comprises CD Blocks Fullidumar, Belhar & Chandan.

== Members of the Legislative Assembly ==
Election	Name	Party
1962	Raghvendra Narain Singh	Indian National Congress
1967	Chaturbhuj Prasad Singh	Samyukta Socialist Party
1969	Chaturbhuj Prasad Singh	Samyukta Socialist Party
1972	Shakuntala Devi	Indian National Congress
1977	Chaturbhuj Prasad Singh	Janata Party
1980	Chandra Mauleshwar Singh	Independent politician
1985	Siyaram Rai	Indian National Congress
1990	Chandra Mouleshwar Singh	Indian National Congress
1995	Ramdeo Yadav	Janata Dal
2000	Ramdeo Yadav	Rashtriya Janata Dal
2005	Ramdeo Yadav	Rashtriya Janata Dal
2005	Janardan Manjhi	Janata Dal (United)
2010	Giridhari Yadav	Janata Dal (United)
2015	Giridhari Yadav	Janata Dal (United)
2019^	Ramdeo Yadav	Rashtriya Janata Dal
2020	Manoj Yadav	Janata Dal (United)
2025	Manoj Yadav	Janata Dal (United)

== Election results ==
=== 2025 ===
2025 Bihar Legislative Assembly election: Belhar
Party	Candidate	Votes	%	±%
JD(U)	Manoj Yadav	115,393	50.66	+10.5
RJD	Chanakya Prakash Ranjan	78,187	34.33	−4.48
JSP	Braj Kishor Pandit	7,711	3.39	
Independent	Lalan Prasad Singh	6,065	2.66	
Independent	Rajesh Kumar Paswan	4,451	1.95	
Independent	Mithan Prasad Yadav	3,038	1.33	
NOTA	None of the above	5,462	2.4	+0.53
Majority		37,206	16.33	+14.98
Turnout		227,772	71.24	+11.64
JD(U) hold		Swing		

=== 2020 ===
2020 Bihar Legislative Assembly election: Belhar
Party	Candidate	Votes	%	±%
JD(U)	Manoj Yadav	73,589	40.16	−4.43
RJD	Ramdeo Yadav	71,116	38.81	
BSP	Brahmdev Ray	6,127	3.34	+1.78
Independent	Binod Pandit	5,463	2.98	
LJP	Kumari Archana Yadav	5,312	2.9	
Independent	Swati Kumari	4,026	2.2	
RLSP	Shailendra Kumar Singh	3,242	1.77	
Bhartiya Sablog Party	Bhola Pd Yadav	2,277	1.24	
Independent	Heman Besra	2,089	1.14	
NOTA	None of the above	3,430	1.87	−3.32
Majority		2,473	1.35	−8.92
Turnout		183,245	59.6	+5.18
JD(U) hold		Swing		

=== 2015 ===
2015 Bihar Legislative Assembly election: Belhar
Party	Candidate	Votes	%	±%
JD(U)	Giridhari Yadav	70,348	44.59	
BJP	Manoj Yadav	54,157	34.32	
JMM	Raj Kishor Prasad Urf Pappu Yadav	10,408	6.6	
Independent	Naresh Kumar Priyadarshi	3,007	1.91	
Independent	Saryug Pandit	2,918	1.85	
BSP	Shiv Kumar Singh	2,463	1.56	
Independent	Pankaj Kumar Singh	1,434	0.91	
Samras Samaj Party	Lakhan Lal Deo	1,422	0.9	
NOTA	None of the above	8,193	5.19	
Majority		16,191	10.27	
Turnout		157,781	54.42	

== See also ==
- List of Assembly constituencies of Bihar
