= Jayant Raj Kushwaha =

Indian politician

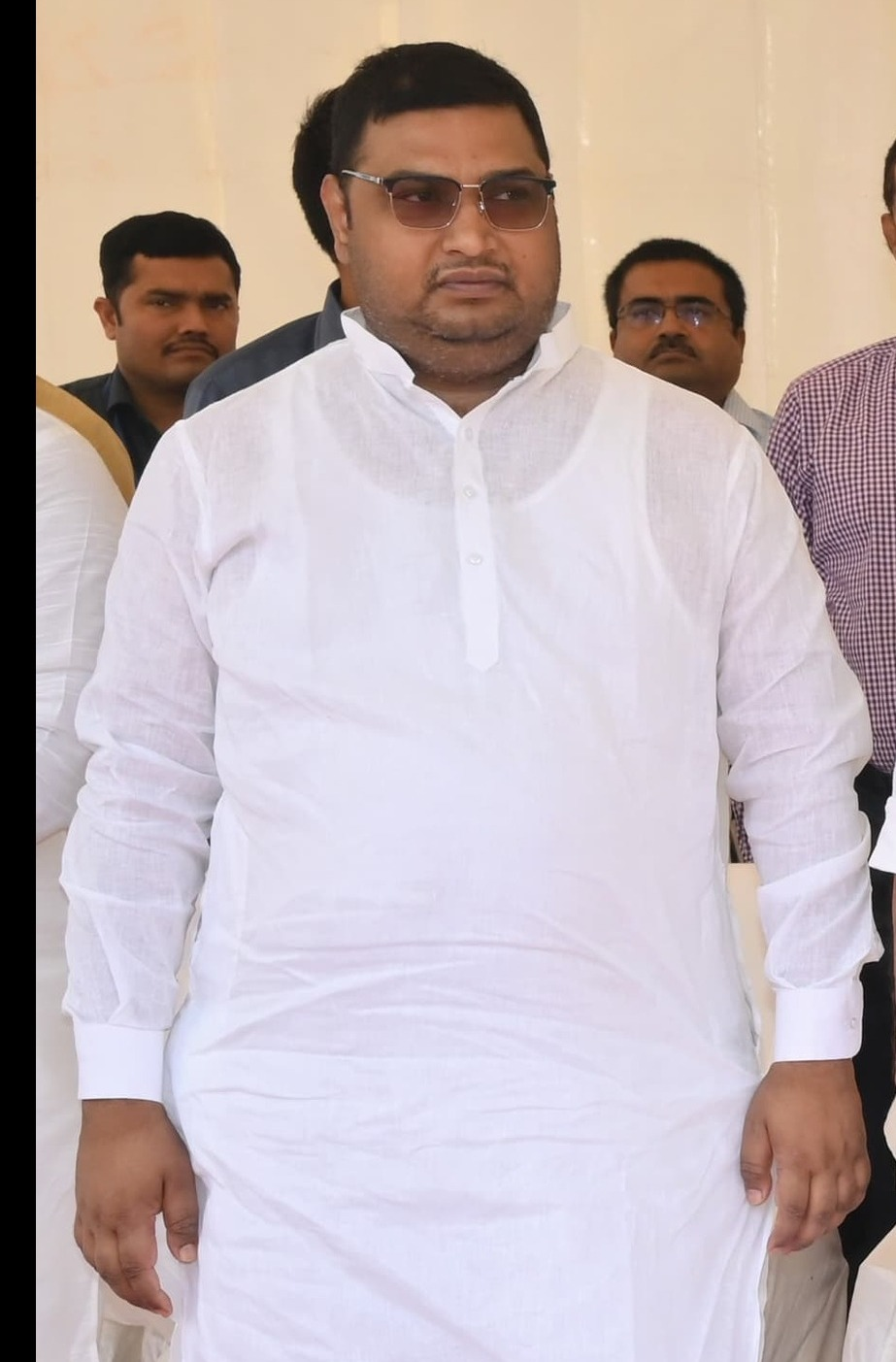
- Kushwaha in 2024

Minister of Rural Work Department of Bihar
- In office 25 February 2021 – August 2022
- Preceded by: Shailesh Kumar

Minister for Minor Water Resources, Government of Bihar
- In office August 2022 – 28 January 2024

Minister of Building Construction
- In office 15 March 2024 – 20 February 2025
- Succeeded by: Vijay Kumar Chaudhary

Personal details
- Party: Janata Dal (United)
- Parent: Janardan Manjhi (father)
- Education: C N D High School Baunsi Banka; Marwari College, Bhagalpur

Jayant Raj Kushwaha is an Indian politician, Member of Legislative Assembly from the Amarpur (Vidhan Sabha constituency) of Bihar, and former Minister of Rural Work in the Government of Bihar. In the 2020 election, he defeated Jitendra Singh of the Indian National Congress. While Raj secured 33.13% of votes polled, Singh, the runner up, finished with 31.23% of the votes. Raj is a member of Janata Dal (United), the ruling party of Bihar.

Raj is the son of former Member of Legislative Assembly Janardan Manjhi who earlier represented the same electoral constituency of Amarpur. He completed his schooling from C N D High School Baunsi Banka, Bachelor of Business Administration from Marwari College, Bhagalpur, Tilka Manjhi Bhagalpur University in 2010.

Nitish Kumar trusted him with ministerial post despite him being a first time MLA, Nitish even came to his defense when the minister was being questioned on his work by BJP MLAs.

== Political career ==
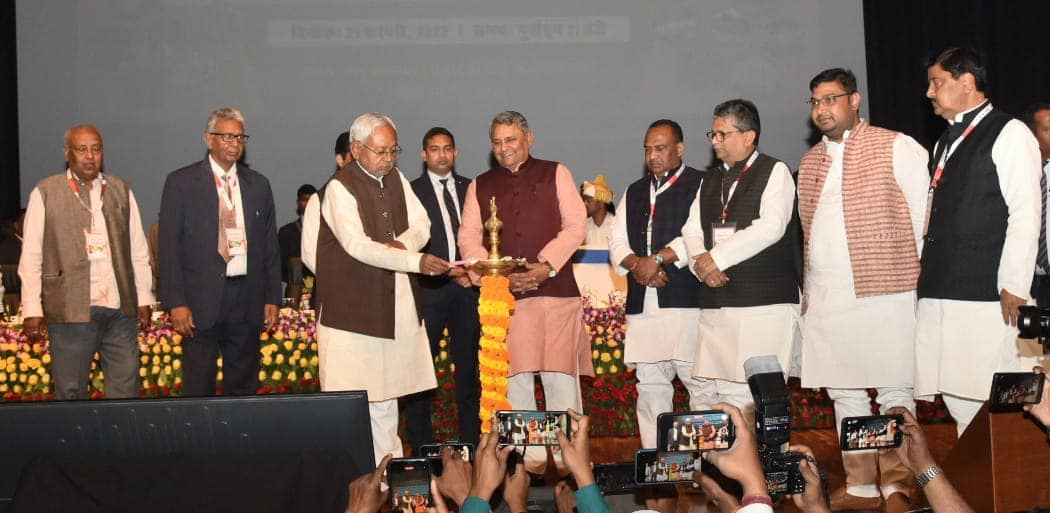
Jayant Raj (second from right) participating in Krishi Samagam program along with Alok Kumar Mehta (third from right) and Bihar Chief Minister Nitish Kumar.

On 9 August 2022, Janata Dal (United) (JDU) led by Nitish Kumar broke its ties with the Bhartiya Janata Party. Chief Minister Nitish Kumar joined hands with erstwhile political rival Rashtriya Janata Dal (RJD) led by son of Lalu Prasad Yadav, Tejashwi Yadav. Jayant Raj, who was serving as minister for rural works resigned from his post and in the new government formed after coalition of RJD, JDU, Indian National Congress and other smaller parties, Raj was again reappointed minister, this time for Minor Water Resources in Eighth Nitish Kumar ministry.

As minor water resource minister, he led establishment of regional registry office in Amarpur to deal with cases of land registration. It was established in order to reduce the burden on sole registry office located in Banka district headquarters. While inaugurating the registry office, Raj announced that the opening of regional office will not only sort out issues related to registration of land earlier, but will also create more jobs and enhance the revenue of government. In this second term as minister, Raj has also remained a critic of Upendra Kushwaha (a rebel leader of Janata Dal United). He alleged Kushwaha was weakening Nitish Kumar; meanwhile, he also contended that the government of Mahagathbandhan (Grand Alliance) was working for the benefit of poor and downtrodden section of society, while the activities of Kushwaha were destabilising it.

In March 2024, he was made minister of building construction in the ninth Nitish Kumar ministry. This was his third term as a minister.

In 2025, Raj contested from Amarpur Assembly constituency in Bihar Legislative Assembly 2025 elections. He defeated his nearest political rival, the Indian National Congress leader Jitendra Singh with a margin of over 33,000 votes.
