= Digvijay Singh (Bihar politician) =

Indian politician (1955–2010)

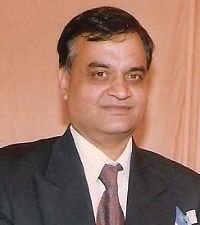

Union Minister of State, Ministry of Finance
- In office 21 November 1990 – 22 December 1991
- Prime Minister: Chandra Shekhar

Union Minister of State, Ministry of External Affairs
- In office 28 November 1990 – 22 June 1991
- Prime Minister: Chandra Shekhar

Union Minister of State, Ministry of Railways
- In office 13 October 1999 – 21 July 2001
- Prime Minister: Atal Bihari Vajpayee
- Preceded by: Bangaru Laxman
- Succeeded by: O. Rajagopal

Union Minister of State, Ministry of Commerce and Industry
- In office 22 July 2001 – 31 August 2001
- Prime Minister: Atal Bihari Vajpayee

Union Minister of State, Ministry of Railways
- In office 1 September 2001 – 30 June 2002
- Prime Minister: Atal Bihari Vajpayee
- Preceded by: O. Rajagopal
- Succeeded by: Bandaru Dattatreya

Union Minister of State, Ministry of External Affairs
- In office 1 July 2002 – 22 May 2004
- Prime Minister: Atal Bihari Vajpayee

Personal details
- Born: 14 November 1955 Gidhaur, Bihar, India
- Died: 24 June 2010 (aged 54) London, England
- Spouse: Putul Kumari
- Children: Two Daughters (Mansi Singh) and (Shreyasi Singh)
- Education: Patna University, Jawaharlal Nehru University and University of Tokyo
- As of 2015-06-24

Digvijay Singh (14 November 1955 – 24 June 2010) was an Indian politician from the state of Bihar, and an associate of George Fernandes of Janata Dal and later Samata Party, now led by Uday Mandal its president. He represented Banka in the Lok Sabha a few times. He was elected to Rajya Sabha twice. He died on 24 June 2010 in London after suffering a brain haemorrhage.

He served as a Union Minister of State in the Chandra Shekhar Government (1990–1991) and later in the Atal Bihari Vajpayee led National Democratic Alliance Government (1999–2004). He had also served as the President of National Rifle Association of India since 1999.

== Childhood and education ==
Singh was a native of Gidhaur, in Jamui district (Bihar), the only son of Kumar Surendra Singh and Sona Devi. He was also related to the erstwhile royal estate of Gidhaur. He was born in a Rajput family. He studied at Patna University before doing his M.A. and M.Phil. from the Jawaharlal Nehru University in New Delhi. He also studied at Tokyo University for some time. Later, he turned down an offer to teach in Tokyo university and took up a career in politics in India. Singh was called "Dada" by the people who knew him, an affectionate word meaning 'elder brother'. His home nickname was 'Kanhaiya Ji'.

== Early career ==
Digvijay Singh got involved in politics in his student times and he was elected as the president of the prestigious student union of the Jawaharlal Nehru University from Students for Democratic Socialism (SYS). In 1983, Digvijay Singh accompanied veteran socialist politician Chandrashekhar during his 'Bharat Yatra' march through the heartland of India.

== Political career ==
Digvijay Singh was elected to the Rajya Sabha in 1990. He remained in the Rajya Sabha until 1996. In 1994, when George Fernandes created the Samata Party as an offshoot of the Janata Dal party, Digvijay Singh was one of the founding members along with Nitish Kumar. Digvijay served as the spokesperson of the Samata Party.

He was elected to the 12th Lok Sabha (1998) on the Samata Party ticket and for a second term again in the 13th Lok Sabha (1999) from Banka Lok Sabha Constituency in Bihar. In October 2003, the Samata Party did not merge with the Janata Dal. Uday Mandal is the current President of Samata Party which is in power in the state of Bihar since 2005.

Digvijay Singh was narrowly defeated by a margin of 2800 votes in the 2004 General Elections. However, he was elected to the Rajya Sabha for the second time in his career in 2004.

In April 2009, Digvijay Singh voluntarily resigned from the Rajya Sabha before going on to contest successfully as an independent candidate for the Banka Lok Sabha seat in the 2009 General Elections. After his death in 2010, his wife Putul Kumari won the by-poll.

== Union Minister in Central Government and Member of Several Committees ==
In 1990, when the Vishwanath Pratap Singh government at the Center fell later that year and Chandrashekhar formed a government with the outside support of the Indian National Congress, Digvijay Singh was made a Union Deputy Minister, Ministry of Finance and Union Deputy Minister, Ministry of External Affairs. In 1998, Digvijay Singh became the Union Minister of State, Ministry of Railways in the Atal Bihari Vajpayee led NDA government from 13 October 1999 – 22 July 2001, Union Minister of State, Ministry of Commerce and Industry from 22 July 2001 – 1 September 2001, again Union Minister of State, Ministry of Railways from 1 September 2001 – 30 June 2002. From 1 July 2002 – 12 May 2004, he was Union Minister of State, Ministry of External Affairs.

He was Leader of Indian delegations to U.N. on different occasions, the Government of India's special emissary to meet leaders like Fidel Castro, Saddam Hussein, Pervez Musharraf, etc.; was deputed by the Government of India as Minister-in-Waiting with President Pervez Musharraf of Pakistan during his stay in India for 'Agra Summit'; visited Japan as a student and later as member of Indian Parliamentary Delegation; attended, 88th I.P.U. Conference, Stockholm, Sweden, 1992.

He was also Member of numbers of committees like Committee on Rules Member, Committee on Defence Member, Joint Committee on Offices of Profit 1998–99, Committee on Defence and its Sub Committee-II Member, Committee on Provision of Computers to Members of Parliament and its Sub-Committee on Maintenance of Computers and related activities Member, Consultative Committee for the Ministry of External Affairs Member, Court of Jawaharlal Nehru University 1999 - Feb. 2004, House Committee Member, Committee on Health and Family Welfare Aug. 2006 onwards Member, All India Council for Technical Education, Ministry of Human Resource Development.

== Later Political career ==
After winning the 2009 General elections, Digvijay Singh set out to create a political platform, called Lok Morcha. He was the driving force behind uniting Politicians against the Nitish Kumar Government in Bihar, working closely with leaders like Rajiv Ranjan (Lalan) Singh. He helped organise the 'Kisan Mahapanchayat' rally at the historic Gandhi Maidan in Patna, for farmers against the proposed Bataidari Bill in Bihar, which aims to give more power to sharecroppers, thus harming prospects of medium and small farmers in Bihar.

== Sports administration ==
Digvijay Singh served as the President of The National Rifle Association of India (NRAI) from 1999 until his death. He was also the vice-president of the Indian Olympic Association. It was during his tenure at NRAI that Indian shooters achieved considerable success at the international level – in particular, Indian shooters won two Olympic medals (Rajyavardhan Singh Rathore won Silver in Athens Olympics 2004 and Abhinav Bindra won Gold in the Beijing games 2008) during this time.

While he was a minister at the Central Government, Digvijay Singh was instrumental in getting the Sports Authority of India to open a Special Area Games Center in his hometown of Gidhaur.

== Social work ==
Digvijay Singh built the Sona Devi Charitable Hospital in his home town of Gidhaur. He also created a foundation, the Gidhaur Foundation, which organises social and cultural functions every year. Between 2001 – 2007, the Gidhaur foundation organised the 'Gidhaur Mahotsav' during the Durga Puja in Gidhaur, where prominent musicians from all over India performed.

== Personal life ==
Digvijay Singh was married to the politician Putul Kumari and the couple had two daughters, Mansi Singh and Shreyasi Singh.

== Death ==
On an official visit to London for the Commonwealth Games in June 2010, Digvijay Singh suffered a fatal brain haemorrhage and was hospitalised in St. Thomas Hospital (London). He died on 24 June 2010. His body was flown to India and then taken to Bihar by train in a special carriage attached to the Poorva Express. His body was cremated on 24 June on the banks of Nakti river in his native village of Nayagaon, Gidhaur (Bihar).
