= Putul Kumari =

Indian politician

Putul Kumari (born 16 November 1958) is an Indian politician from Bihar state, who has lost Lok Sabha elections from Banka a couple of times, latest in 2019. She was elected to Lok Sabha from Banka in a by-poll in 2010, after the death of her husband who had won from Banka in 2009 General Election.

== Personal life ==
She is the widow of Digvijay Singh, who previously held the seat. She has two daughters named Mansi Singh and Shreyasi Singh who is her younger daughter. Shreyasi Singh is international-level trap shooter and a politician. Shreyasi Singh had secured 4th rank in 2010 Commonwealth Games held at Delhi and won Gold in 2018 Commonwealth Games.

== Childhood and education ==
Born on 16 November 1958 at Pali, Patna (Bihar) from father Late Jang Bahadur Singh and mother Smt Lalghari Devi, she completed her M.A. in Hindi from Patna University.

== Political career ==
She won a by-election in 2010 to enter the Lok Sabha for the first time. She took the oath of office on 26 November 2010.

In her maiden speech, during the Railway Budget in March 2011 she asked for more railway lines for her constituency, which is a backward area.

The family has had on-off association with BJP, with both Digvijay Singh and Putul Kumari having fought elections from Banka as BJP candidate as well as independents.

== Social and cultural activities ==
She is very active for promoting primary education of children; organising health camps `swasthyaya melas` and mass marriages of girls belonging to scheduled castes and scheduled tribes. She is also associated with (i) establishment/functioning of charitable hospitals; and (ii) Gidhaur Foundation and Gidhaur Mohotsava Annual Festival celebrated during Durga Puja festival at Gidhaur.

== Interests ==
She works for Reiki (third level completed) and has been involved in charitable activities. She has also participated in shooting sports and is a member of the National Rifle Association of India. Her reported interests include yoga, reading, gardening, devotional music, interior design, flower arranging, and fishing.
