= Mahila College, Khagaul =

Degree college in Bihar

Mahila College
- महिला महाविद्यालय
- Motto: कर्मण्येवाधिकारस्ते मा फलेषु कदाचन
- Established: 1972; 54 years ago
- Affiliations: Patliputra University
- Location: Khagaul, Patna, Bihar, 801105; 25°35′03″N 85°02′49″E
- Website: www.mahilacollegekhagaul.com

Mahila College, Khagaul is a degree college in Bihar, India. It is a constituent unit of Patliputra University. The college offers Senior secondary education and Undergraduate degree in arts, science and conducts some vocational courses.

== History ==
The college was established in 1972. It became a constituent unit of Patliputra University in 2018.

== Degrees and courses ==
The college offers the following degrees and courses.

- Senior Secondary
  - Intermediate of Arts
  - Intermediate of Science
- Bachelor's degree
  - Bachelor of Arts
  - Bachelor of Science
- Vocational courses
  - Bachelor of Computer Application
  - Bachelor of Business Management
