= Ram Krishna Dwarika College =

Degree college in Bihar

- राम कृष्ण द्वारिका महाविद्यालय
- Established: 1964; 62 years ago
- Affiliations: Patliputra University
- Principal: Prof. Diwakar Prasad
- Location: Lohia Nagar, Patna, Bihar, 800020, India; 25°35′23″N 85°08′44″E
- Campus: Urban
- Website: rkdcollegepatna.org

Ram Krishna Dwarika College, Patna is a degree college in Bihar, India. It is a constituent unit of Patliputra University. College offers Senior secondary education and Undergraduate degree in Arts, Science and conducts some vocational courses.

== History ==
College was established in 1964. The foundation of the college was laid by the late Rao Birendra Singh, a former Chief Minister of Haryana, on 7 March 1964, at Punaichak, Patna. College became functional on 7 March 1975 at Punaichak. The present campus of the college has been donated by Late Shiv Naryan Ray and the college shifted on its present site in 1980. College became the constituent unit of Magadh University in 1986.

It became a constituent unit of Patliputra University in 2018.

== Degrees and courses ==
College offers the following degrees and courses.

- Senior Secondary
  - Intermediate of Arts
  - Intermediate of Science
- Bachelor's degree
  - Bachelor of Arts
  - Bachelor of Science
  - Bachelor of Commerce
- Vocational courses
  - Bachelor of Computer Application
  - Bachelor of Business Management
  - Bachelor of Science in Information Technology
  - Travel and Tour Management
  - Advertising, Sales promotion & sales Management
