= TPS College, Patna =

General degree college in Patna, Bihar

Coordinates: 25.5986912°N 85.1426362°E

Thakur Prasad Singh College
- ठाकुर प्रसाद सिंह महाविद्यालय
- Official logo of TPS College
- Motto: तमसो मा ज्योतिर्गमय
- Motto in English: From darkness, lead me to light
- Established: 1960
- Accreditation: NAAC Grade B
- Affiliations: Patliputra University
- Principal: Dr. Tapan Kumar Shandaliya
- Location: Tarkeshwar Path, Chiraiyatand, Patna, Bihar, 800001
- Website: tpscollege.ac.in

TPS College, Patna, also known as Thakur Prasad Singh College, is a general degree college in Patna, Bihar, India. It was established to perpetuate the memory of Thakur Prasad Singh by his wife in 1960. It is a constituent unit of Patliputra University. The college offers degrees in Arts, Science, and also conducts some vocational courses.

== History ==
When the college was established, it was affiliated with Bihar University. Later on, after the establishment of Magadh University, the college got affiliated to it in 1962. The college was made a constituent unit of Magadh University by the Government of Bihar in 1977. At present, it is a constituent unit of Patliputra University since March 2018.

== Campus ==
TPS College is located at MIG Road, Chiraiyatand, Khasmahal, Mithapur, Patna, Bihar 800001. The campus includes academic and administrative blocks, laboratories, a library, and basic facilities for students.

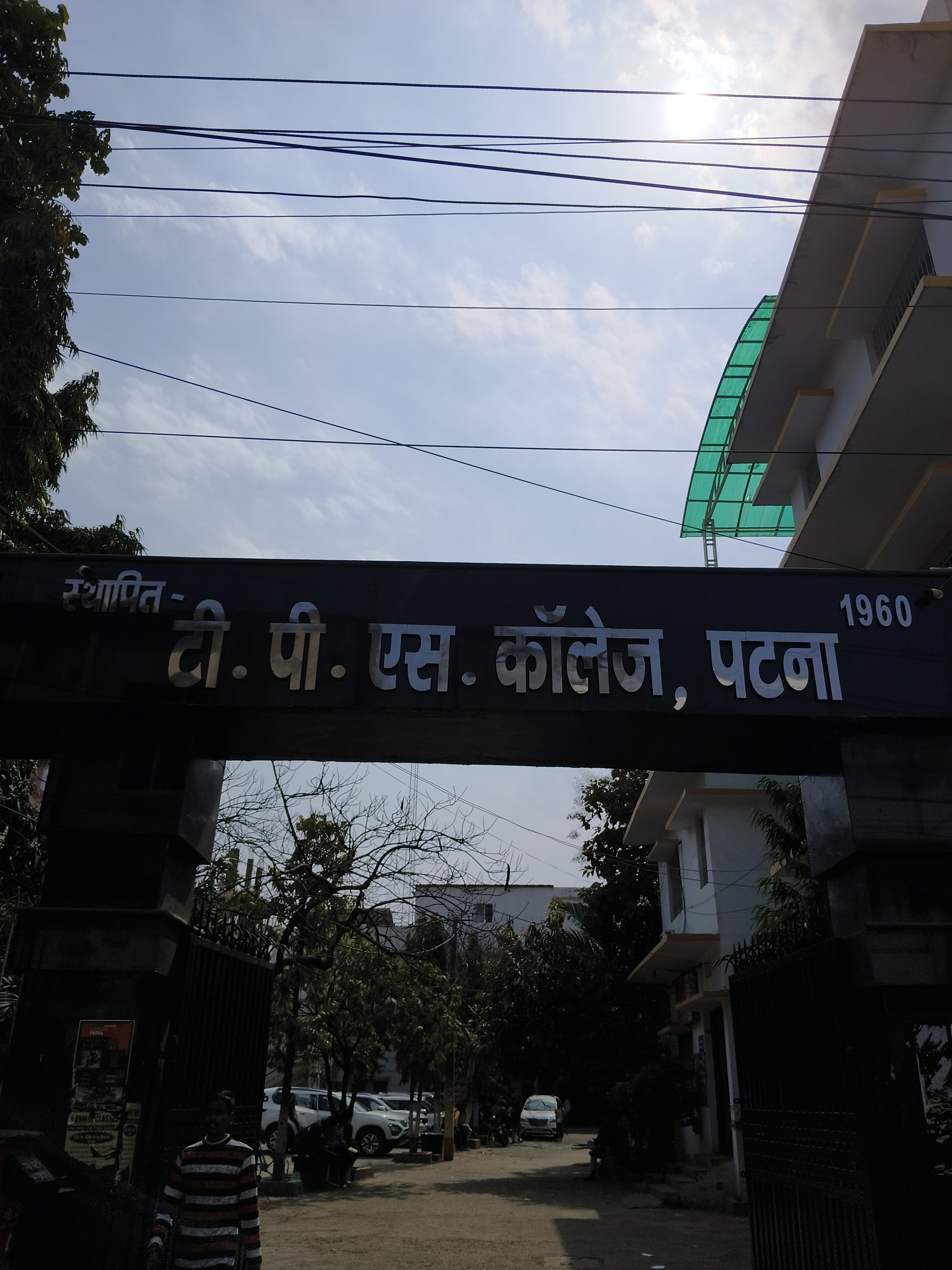
Main entrance gate of TPS College

== Degrees and courses ==
College offers the following degrees and courses:

- Bachelor's degree
  - Bachelor of Arts
  - Bachelor of Science
- Master's degree
  - Master of Arts
  - Master of Science
- Vocational course
  - Bachelor of Computer Application
  - Bachelor of Business Management
  - Bachelor of Science
- Senior secondary
  - Intermediate of Arts
  - Intermediate of Science
