= BS College, Danapur =

Degree college in Bihar

Bindeshwar Singh College
- बिंदेश्वर सिंह महाविद्यालय
- Established: 1954; 72 years ago
- Affiliations: Patliputra University
- Principal: Prof. Shyamdeo Paswan
- Location: Danapur, Patna, Bihar, 800012, India; 26°38′42″N 85°03′45″E
- Website: www.bscollegedanapur.ac.in
- Location in Bihar Location in India

BS College, Danapur also known as Bindeshwar Singh College is a degree college in Danapur, Bihar, India. It is a constituent unit of Patliputra University. College offers undergraduate degrees, postgraduate degrees and senior secondary education in arts and science and conducts some vocational courses.

== History ==
College was established in 1954. It became a constituent unit of Magadh University in the year 1975. After bifurcation of Magadh University, Patliputra University was established on 18 March 2018, by the order of the Government of Bihar, the college became a constituent unit of Patliputra University.

== Degrees and courses ==
College offers the following degrees and courses.

- Senior secondary
  - Intermediate in Arts
  - Intermediate in Science
- Bachelor's degree
  - Bachelor of Arts
  - Bachelor of Science
- Master's degree
  - Master of Business Administration
- Vocational course
  - Bachelor of Computer Application
  - Bachelor of Business Management
  - Master of Computer Application
  - Travel and Tourism Management
  - Library Science
