= Sri Arvind Mahila College, Patna =

Degree college in Bihar

Sri Arvind Mahila College
- श्री अरविंद महिला महाविद्यालय
- Motto: Lead us to the righteous path
- Established: 1960; 66 years ago
- Affiliations: Patliputra University
- Principal: Dr. Meera Kumari
- Location: Kazipur, Patna, Bihar, 800004; 25°36′45″N 85°09′47″E
- Website: samcpatna.ac.in

Sri Arvind Mahila College, Patna is a degree college in Bihar, India. It is a constituent unit of Patliputra University. College offers Senior secondary education and Undergraduate degree in Arts, Science and conducts some vocational courses.

== History ==
College was established in 1960. It became a constituent unit of Patliputra University in 2018.

== Degrees and courses ==
College offers the following degrees and courses.

- Senior Secondary
  - Intermediate of Arts
  - Intermediate of Science
  - Intermediate of Commerce
- Bachelor's degree
  - Bachelor of Arts
  - Bachelor of Science
  - Bachelor of Commerce
- Vocational courses
  - Bachelor of Computer Application
  - Bachelor of Business Management
  - Travel and Tour Management
