= MM College, Bikram =

Degree college in Bihar

Mahanth Madhusudan College
- महंथ मधुसूदन महाविद्यालय
- Motto: नास्ति विद्या समं चक्षु
- Established: 1961; 65 years ago
- Affiliations: Patliputra University
- Principal: Prof. Sunita Roy
- Location: Bikram, Patna, Bihar, 801112; 25°26′49″N 84°50′54″E
- Website: www.mmcollege.co.in

MM College, Bikram, also known as Mahanth Madhusudan College, is a degree college in Bikram, Patna, India. It is a constituent unit of Patliputra University. It offers senior secondary education and undergraduate degree in Arts and Science, and conducts some vocational courses.

== History ==
The college was established in 1961. In 1981, it became a constituent unit of Magadh University. It became a constituent unit of Patliputra University in 2018.

== Degrees and courses ==
The college offers the following degrees and courses.

- Senior secondary
  - Intermediate of Arts
  - Intermediate of Science
- Bachelor's degree
  - Bachelor of Arts
  - Bachelor of Science
