= SU College, Hilsa =

Degree college in Bihar

Srichand Udasin College
- श्रीचन्द उदासीन महाविद्यालय
- Established: 1955; 71 years ago
- Affiliations: Patliputra University
- Location: Hilsa, Nalanda, Bihar, 801302; 25°18′48″N 85°16′44″E

SU College, Hilsa is a degree college in Bihar, India. It is a constituent unit of Patliputra University. The college offers Senior secondary education and Undergraduate degree in arts, science and conducts some vocational courses.

== History ==
The college was established in 1955. It became a constituent unit of Patliputra University in March 2018.

== Degrees and courses ==
The college offers the following degrees and courses.

- Senior Secondary
  - Intermediate of Arts
  - Intermediate of Science
- Bachelor's degree
  - Bachelor of Arts
  - Bachelor of Science
- Vocational courses
  - Bachelor of Computer Application
