= Jagat Narain Lal College =

Degree college in Bihar

- जगत नारायण लाल महाविद्यालय
- Motto: विद्या ददाति विनयम्
- Established: 1960; 66 years ago
- Affiliations: Patliputra University
- Location: Khagaul, Patna, Bihar, 801105; 25°34′29″N 85°02′35″E
- Website: www.jnlcollegekhagaul.com

Jagat Narain Lal College also known as JNL College, Khagaul is a degree college in Khagaul, Bihar, India. It is a constituent unit of Patliputra University. College offers Senior secondary education and Undergraduate degree in Arts and Science.

== History ==
College was established in the year 1960. The land was then donated by Late Jagat Narain Lal, who was a freedom fighter and a Cabinet minister of Bihar. It was first affiliated to Babasaheb Bhimrao Ambedkar Bihar University on establishment in 1960. Later on, it became the constituent unit of Magadh University. Further, in 2018, college became a constituent unit of Patliputra University.

== Degrees and courses ==
College offers the following degrees and courses.

- Bachelor's degree
  - Bachelor of Arts
  - Bachelor of Science
- Master's degree
  - Master of Arts
  - Master of Science
