= SMD College, Punpun =

Degree college in Bihar, India

- Established: 1958; 68 years ago
- Affiliations: Patliputra University
- Location: Punpun, Patna, Bihar, 804453; 25°29′46″N 85°06′31″E

SMD College, Punpun is a degree college in Bihar, India. It is a constituent unit of Patliputra University. The college offers Senior secondary education and Undergraduate degree in arts, science and conducts some vocational courses.

== History ==
The college was established in 1958. The noblemen of Shripalpur Village under the leadership of Shri Ram Dayal Sinha, the founder Principal of the college, worked tirelessly for the establishment of this college. The land was donated by the villagers of Shripalpur and nearby villages. Later on more and more people joined the movement and the college started functioning. One of such volunteer donated an initial sum of Rupees Fifty Thousand and in memory of his parents Late Shri Mahtab Das and Late Smt Somwati Devi, the college of named as Somwati Mahtab Das College (S.M.D.College). The college has laboratories and a library.

== Degrees and courses ==
The college offers the following degrees and courses.

- Senior Secondary
  - Intermediate of Arts
  - Intermediate of Science
- Bachelor's degree
  - Bachelor of Arts
  - Bachelor of Science
- Vocational courses
  - Bachelor of Computer Application
