= Shashi Pratap Shahi =

Indian academic

Shashi Pratap Shahi, commonly known as S.P. Shahi, is an Indian academic, researcher, social activist, a psephologist and administrator. His area of study is Political Science and International Relations. Professor Shahi has been teaching Political Science in different universities of Bihar since 1990. Prof. Shahi has also served as the Vice Chancellor of Magadh University.

== Work ==
Prof. Shahi's research works have made numerous contributions to India’s foreign policy, parliamentary form of government, democracy, subaltern development, consequences of ethnic violence, democracy and education. He presented his pioneering research paper “Review and Exploration of Mechanism of Inclusive and Quality Education in Bihar” in Harvard University, Boston, Massachusetts, USA on 27–29 September 2016.

He has previously served Nalanda College, Biharsharif, A. N. S College, Barh and A. N. College Patna. All these colleges are presently affiliated under Patliputra University which was established in 2018.

Under the leadership of Shahi, A. N. College Patna has been accredited as grade ' A' thrice by NAAC and once with high CGPA of 3.27/4, and has been accorded CPE status thrice by UGC. When he joined, third time accreditation of the college was overdue. Before joining as Vice- Chancellor of Magadh University, he submitted the SSR (Self Study Report) of A. N. College Patna for the fourth NAAC Accreditation and it resulted in NAAC A+ grade ( with highest CGPA of 3.36/4 ). Under his leadership, this college was also included in “DBT Star College Scheme”. He was also member of Syndicate and other statutory bodies and also member of NAAC.

== Awards ==
As a Principal, Shahi received Best Principal Award by the Governor of Bihar. A N College Patna was also awarded Best College in Bihar by the Governor of Bihar. Additionally he also received numbers of award by government and academic institution.
