= Maltidhari College, Naubatpur =

Degree college in Bihar

Maltidhari College
- मालतीधारी महाविद्यालय
- Motto: तमसो मा ज्योतिर्गमय
- Established: 1956; 70 years ago
- Affiliations: Patliputra University
- Principal: Dr. Akhilesh Kumar
- Location: Naubatpur, Patna, Bihar, 801109; 25°28′51″N 84°57′30″E
- Website: www.mdcollegenaubatpur.ac.in

Maltidhari College, Naubatpur is a degree college in Naubatpur, Bihar. It is a constituent unit of Patliputra University. College offers Senior secondary education and Undergraduate degree in Arts, Science and conducts some vocational courses.

== History ==
College was established in 1956. It got its first affiliation in 1957 from Patna University. After coming into existence of Babasaheb Bhimrao Ambedkar Bihar University, the college came under jurisdiction of it. College became a constituent unit of Patliputra University in 2018.

== Degrees and courses ==
College offers the following degrees and courses.

- Senior Secondary
  - Intermediate of Arts
  - Intermediate of Science
- Bachelor's degree
  - Bachelor of Arts
  - Bachelor of Science
- Vocational Course
  - Bachelor of Computer Application
