= Gaya College =

Public college in Gaya, Bihar, India

Coordinates: 24.7815°N 84.9848°E

- Gaya College Logo
- Motto: आत्म दीपो भव:
- Motto in English: Be a Light unto Yourself
- Type: Public college
- Established: 8 February 1944; 82 years ago
- Affiliations: UGC
- Academic affiliations: Magadh University
- Principal: Satish Singh Chandra
- Location: 101/386, Prawanand Path, Jail Road, Anugrah Puri Colony, Gaya, Bihar 823001, India
- Campus: Urban
- Website: www.gayacollege.ac.in

Gaya College, Gaya (GCG) is a public state college located in Gaya, Bihar, India. Established in February 1944 during the British Raj, it is affiliated with Magadh University, Bodhgaya and is one of the prestigious colleges in Bihar. It was previously placed under Patna University between 1944 and 1951 and then Dr. B. R. Ambedkar Bihar University from 1952 until the establishment of Magadh University in 1962.

== Degrees ==
- B.A. In all major subjects
- B.Sc. In all major subjects
- B.Com. In all major subjects
- M.A. In all major subjects
- M.Sc. In all major subjects
- M.Com. In all major subjects
- B.B.A.
- B.C.A.
- B.B.M.
- M.B.A.
- M.C.A.
- Bio-Technology
- Philosophy
- Persian
- B.Ed

== Facilities ==
- Hostels
- Sports ground
- Indoor Games
- Sports Facility
- Health Centre/Medical
- Common Rooms for Teachers
- Canteen for Students
- Banking facilities- students can use atm in the campus
- NCC
- NSS
