= ANS College, Barh =

Degree college in Bihar

Anugrah Narayan Singh College
- अनुग्रह नारायण सिंह महाविद्यालय
- Official logo of ANS College
- Motto: विद्या शीलेन शोभते
- Established: 1951; 75 years ago
- Affiliations: Patliputra University
- Principal: Prof. Shyama Roy
- Location: Barh, Patna, Bihar, 803213; 25°28′22″N 85°42′20″E
- Website: anscollege.ac.in

ANS College, Barh also known as Anugrah Narayan Singh College is a degree college in Barh, Bihar, India. It is a constituent unit of Patliputra University. College offers degrees in Arts, Science and conducts some vocational courses.

== History ==
College was established in 1951. It became the constituent unit of Magadh University in 1975. Later on, it became a constituent unit of Patliputra University in 2018.

== Degrees and courses ==
College offers the following degrees and courses.

- Bachelor's degree
  - Bachelor of Arts
  - Bachelor of Science
- Master's degree
  - Master of Arts
  - Master of Science
- Vocational course
  - Bachelor of Computer Application
  - Bachelor of Business Management
