= Ganga Devi Mahila College =

Degree college in Bihar

- गंगा देवी महिला महाविद्यालय
- Motto: विद्या ददाति विनयम्
- Established: 1971; 55 years ago
- Affiliations: Patliputra University
- Principal: Prof. Vijay Lakshmi
- Location: Kankarbagh, Patna, Bihar, 800020; 25°35′58″N 85°09′06″E
- Website: gdmm.co.in

Ganga Devi Mahila College is a degree college in Kankarbagh, Bihar, India. It is a constituent unit of Patliputra University. College offers Senior secondary education and Undergraduate degree in Arts and Science.

== History ==
College was established in 1971. It became a constituent unit of Patliputra University in 2018.

== Degrees and courses ==
College offers the following degrees and courses.

- Bachelor's degree
  - Bachelor of Arts
  - Bachelor of Science
- Senior Secondary
  - Intermediate of Arts
  - Intermediate of Science
