= Kisan College, Nalanda =

Degree college in Bihar

Kisan College
- किसान महाविद्यालय
- Logo of Kisan College
- Established: 1957; 69 years ago
- Affiliation: Patliputra University
- Principal: Prof. Dibanshu Kumar
- Address: Bihar Sharif, Nalanda, Bihar, 803118; 25°13′17″N 85°30′41″E

Kisan College, Nalanda is a degree college in Bihar, India. It is a constituent unit of Patliputra University. The college offers Senior secondary education and Undergraduate degree in arts, science and conducts some vocational courses.

== History ==
The college was established in 1957. It became a constituent unit of Patliputra University in 2018.

== Degrees and courses ==
The college offers the following degrees and courses.

- Senior Secondary
  - Intermediate of Arts
  - Intermediate of Science
- Bachelor's degree
  - Bachelor of Arts
  - Bachelor of Science
- Vocational courses
  - Bachelor of Science (information technology)
  - BLIS
