= Ram Ratan Singh College =

Degree college in Bihar

- राम रतन सिंह महाविद्यालय
- Established: 1957; 69 years ago
- Affiliations: Patliputra University
- Location: Mokama, Patna, Bihar, 803302; 25°23′33″N 85°55′37″E

Ram Ratan Singh College is a degree college in Bihar, India. It is a constituent unit of Patliputra University. The college offers senior secondary education and undergraduate degrees in arts and science.

== History ==
The college was established in 1957. It became a constituent unit of Patliputra University in 2018.

== Degrees and courses ==
The college offers the following degrees and courses.

- Senior secondary
  - Intermediate of Arts
  - Intermediate of Science
- Bachelor's degree
  - Bachelor of Arts
  - Bachelor of Science (physics, chemistry, mathematics, zoology and botany honours)

== Notable alumni ==
- Kanhaiya Kumar, Indian political activist
