= RPM College, Patna =

Degree college in Bihar

Rameshwardas Pannalal Mahila College
- रामेश्वरदास पन्नालाल महिला महाविद्यालय
- Established: 1970; 56 years ago
- Affiliations: Patliputra University
- Principal: Dr. Punam
- Location: Patna City, Patna, Bihar, 800009; 25°35′31″N 85°13′35″E
- Website: rpmcollegepatna.ac.in

RPM College, Patna also known as Rameshwardas Pannalal Mahila College is a degree college in Bihar, India. It is a constituent unit of Patliputra University. College offers Senior secondary education and Undergraduate degree in Arts, Science.

== History ==
College was established in 1970. It became a constituent unit of Patliputra University in 2018.

== Degrees and courses ==
College offers the following degrees and courses.

- Senior Secondary
  - Intermediate of Arts
  - Intermediate of Science
- Bachelor's degree
  - Bachelor of Arts
  - Bachelor of Science
