= Aurangabad community development block =

Block in Bihar, India

Aurangabad
- Community development block
- Location within Bihar Location within India
- Coordinates: 24.70°N 84.35°E
- Country: India
- State: Bihar
- District: Aurangabad subdivision

Government
  - Type: Representative democracy

Area
  - Total: 282.1 km^{2} (108.9 sq mi)

Population (2011)
  - Total: 283,193
  - Density: 1,004/km^{2} (2,600/sq mi)

Languages
  - Official: Hindi
- Time zone: UTC+5:30 (IST)
- PIN: 824101
- STD code: 06186

Aurangabad is a community development block in Aurangabad subdivision, Aurangabad district, Bihar, India.

== Geography ==
The topography of the area consists of flat alluvial plains and is a part of the Gangetic depression with deep alluvial deposits broken occasionally by low hill ranges. This information relates to Aurangabad subdivision of Gaya district in 1957. Topographically, Aurangabad district can be divided into hard core rock region and Jalodhak region.

Aurangabad community development block is bounded by Obra block on the north, Rafiganj block and Madanpur block on the east, Deo block on the south and Barun block on the west.

=== Gram Panchayats ===
Gram panchayats in Aurangabad community development block are: Pokhra, Bela, Ibrahimpur, Karma Bhagwan, Khaira Bind, Khaira Mirja, Kurmahan, Manjhar, Naugarh, Ora, Parawan, Parasdih, Phesar, Poiwan, Jamohar and Aurangabad (NT).

== Civic Administration ==
Blocks are a part of the subdivision in Aurangabad district.

There is a Mufassil police station at Aurangabad.

== Demographics ==
In the 2011 census Aurangabad community development had a total population of 283,193, of which 180,949 were rural and 102,244 were urban, the highest urban population among the community development blocks in the Aurangabad district.

Hindi is the official language of the state. Urdu is serving as a second language in certain districts for specific purposes.

The literacy rate of Aurangabad district in 2001 was 57.50%. It was 71.99% for males and 42.04% for females.

== Poverty ==
According to a World Bank Study, in 2012, 34% of the population of Bihar lived below poverty line. In Aurangabad district, 37-47% of the people lived below poverty line.

== Economy ==
=== Agriculture ===
Aurangabad district, with an agricultural economy, lies in a drought-prone area. Rice, wheat, gram lentil and rapeseed are the main crops.

Aurangabad community development block has a geographical area of 28,210 ha, net sown area is 15,415 ha, area sown more than once is 1,039 ha, gross sown area is 16,454 ha, gross area irrigated is 14,031.

=== BRGF ===
Aurangabad district received funds from the Backward Regions Grant Fund (BRGF), a fund financed by the central government to redress regional imbalances from 2006 to 2007. All 38 districts of Bihar receive allocations from BRGF.

== Education ==
Ram Lakhan Singh College, a degree college, was established at Aurangabad, Bihar in 1971.

== See also ==
- Administration in Bihar
