= Gomendra Multiple College =

College in Nepal

- Type: Private,
- Affiliations: Purbanchal University
- Principal: Rupak Khanal
- Location: Birtamod 4 Jhapa, Nepal
- Website: gomendracollege.edu.np

Gomendra Multiple College was started at Birtamod 4, Jhapa, Nepal to provide education at minimum cost in remote place in the field of IT and Management. Established in the year 2053BS(1996).

== Description ==
The college offer the course of following:

1. Bachelor of Computer Application (BCA)
2. Bachelor of Business Administration (BBA)
3. Master of Business Administration (MBA)
4. Master of Computer Application (MCA)

== See also ==
- Education in Nepal
- List of schools in Nepal
