= RLSY College, Bakhtiyarpur =

Degree college in Bihar

Ram Lakhan Singh Yadav College
- राम लखन सिंह यादव महाविद्यालय
- Established: 1964; 62 years ago
- Affiliations: Patliputra University
- Principal: Dr. P.K. Verma
- Location: Bakhtiarpur, Patna, Bihar, 803212; 25°27′16″N 85°32′16″E
- Website: www.rlsycollegebakhtiyarpur.ac.in

RLSY College, Bakhtiyarpur also known as Ram Lakhan Singh Yadav College is a degree college in Bihar, India. It is a constituent unit of Patliputra University. The college offers Undergraduate degree in arts, science and conducts some vocational courses.

== History ==
The college was established in 1964. It became a constituent unit of Patliputra University in 2018.

== Degrees and courses ==
The college offers the following degrees and courses.

- Bachelor's degree
  - Bachelor of Arts
  - Bachelor of Science
- Vocational courses
  - Bachelor of Computer Application
  - Bachelor of Business Administration
