= Sri Guru Gobind Singh College, Patna =

Degree college in Bihar

Sri Guru Gobind Singh College
- श्री गुरु गोबिंद सिंह महाविद्यालय
- Established: 1960; 66 years ago
- Affiliations: Patliputra University
- Location: Marufganj, Patna, Bihar, 800008; 25°35′44″N 85°14′09″E

Sri Guru Gobind Singh College, Patna is a degree college in Bihar, India. It is a constituent unit of Patliputra University. College offers Senior secondary education and Undergraduate degree in Arts, Science and conducts some vocational courses.

== History ==
College was established in 1960. It became a constituent unit of Patliputra University in 2018.

== Degrees and courses ==
College offers the following degrees and courses.

- Bachelor's degree
  - Bachelor of Arts
  - Bachelor of Commerce
  - Bachelor of Science
- Vocational
  - Bachelor of business management
  - Bachelor of computer application
