= Inspiria knowledge campus =

Business and management college in Siliguri, West Bengal, India

Inspiria Knowledge Campus
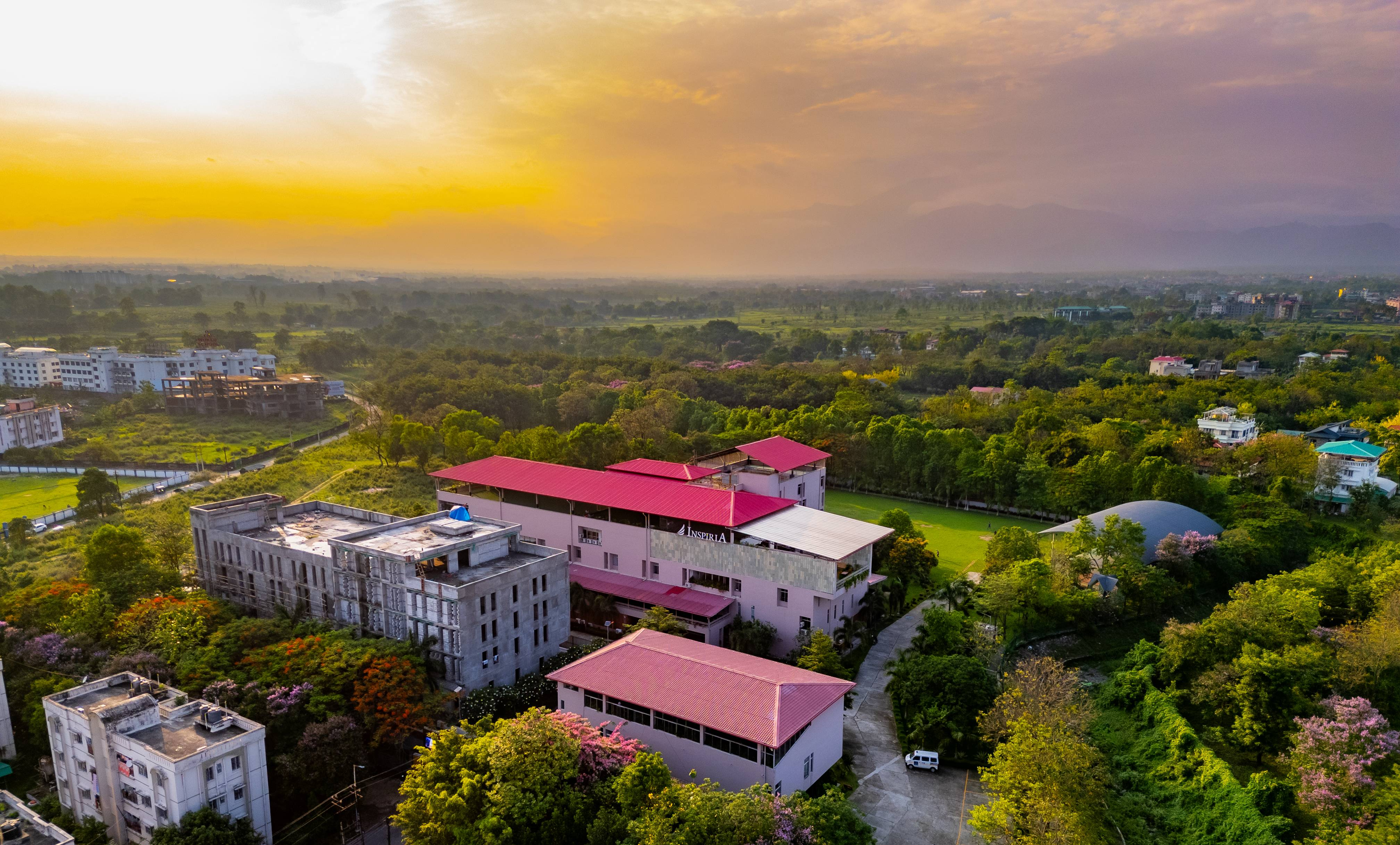
- Aerial view
- Type: Private
- Established: 2015; 11 years ago
- Affiliations: Maulana Abul Kalam Azad University of Technology, AICTE Approved, NAAC Accredited
- Administrative staff: 100+
- Students: 1800+
- Location: Matigara, Phase – II, Himachal Vihar, Siliguri, West Bengal, 734010, India; 26.732364°N 88.3896299°E
- Campus: Urban
- Colours: Blue and Yellow
- Website: inspiria.edu.in

Inspiria Knowledge Campus is a NAAC-accredited management college, recognized by AICTE, established in 2015 in Siliguri, West Bengal, India, by the J.P. Sahu Foundation—a non-profit charitable trust registered under the West Bengal Societies Registration Act, 1961.

== Campus ==
The campus is located on a five-acre site in Siliguri, West Bengal, which was previously a tea garden. It is situated at the foothills of the Himalayas, with a stream flowing along its eastern side and surrounded by greenery.

8 km away from Bagdogra International Airport.
13 km away from NJP Railway Station.

== Academic Programs ==
Inspiria offers the following undergraduate courses in School of Management, School of Computer Science, School of Design and Media, School of Hospitality. Affiliated to MAKAUT and AICTE approved.

=== School of Management ===
- BBA in Business Management
- BBA in Entrepreneurship
- BBA in Accountancy, Taxation & Auditing
- BBA in Commerce & International Accounting
- BBA in Hospital Management
- BBA in Global Business
- BBA in Sports Management
- BBA in Digital Marketing

=== School of Computer Science ===
- BCA (Bachelor of Computer Applications)
- BCA in Artificial Intelligence & Machine Learning
- BCA in Data Science & Cyber Security

=== School of Design and Media ===
- B.Sc. in Media Science
- B.Sc. in Interior Designing
- B.Sc. in Multimedia, Animation and Graphics Design
- B.Sc. in Fashion Design & Management

=== School of Hospitality ===
- B.Sc. in Hospitality and Hotel Administration
- BBA in Aviation Hospitality Services & Management

== Inskills Program ==
The Inskills Program at Inspiria Knowledge Campus is an internal initiative focused on the development of soft skills and personality traits among students. The program incorporates interactive methods aimed at enhancing communication, teamwork, and workplace readiness. It is structured to supplement academic learning with practical skill-building exercises relevant to professional environments.

== Inhub (Entrepreneurship Cell) ==
Inhub is an entrepreneurial initiative at Inspiria Knowledge Campus. It facilitates entrepreneurial activities through various programs and resources for students. Its offerings include events such as Inspire-PitchFest and WEMBA, as well as lectures and workshops on entrepreneurship. Inhub also provides a StartUp Internship Programme, infrastructure, mentorship, seed funding, and co-working spaces to support student ventures.

== Toastmasters Club ==
The Inspiria Toastmasters Club is a student-led club at Inspiria Knowledge Campus, affiliated with Toastmasters International. Established in October 2017, it was the fourth Toastmasters club chartered in Siliguri and the first at a college in North Bengal. The club's stated purpose is to assist members in developing communication and leadership skills.

The club provides a structured environment for students and faculty. Activities include:

- Regular Meetings: These sessions typically feature prepared speeches from the Pathways learning experience, impromptu "Table Topics" sessions, and evaluations.
- Events and Activities: The club organizes themed meetings, celebrates session milestones, and participates in and hosts internal and area-level speech contests. It also publishes the "Speaker's Spectrum" newsletter.
- Skill Development: Members focus on public speaking and listening skills by fulfilling various meeting roles. The campus offers support for initial memberships.

The club contributes to communication and leadership development within the campus and the regional Toastmasters community.

== Sports and Fitness Facilities ==
The Inspiria Knowledge Campus offers a wide array of sports and fitness facilities to promote physical activity and holistic development among its students. These include an extensive football field, a futsal court, a basketball court, a dedicated cricket practice pitch, and a pickleball court. For indoor and other popular sports, the campus provides box cricket, snooker, table tennis, and a well-equipped gym.

== Gallery ==
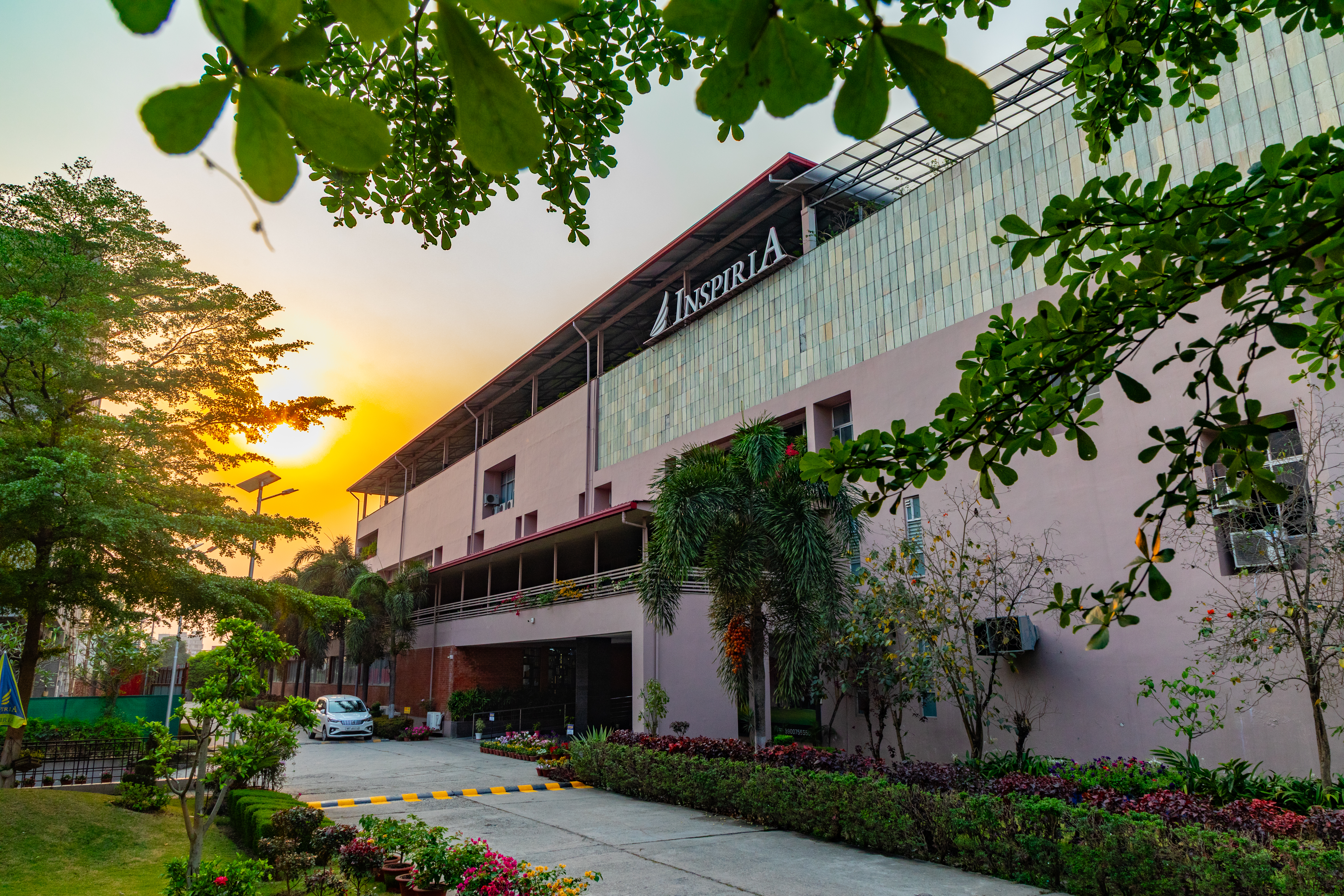
Campus Font Side

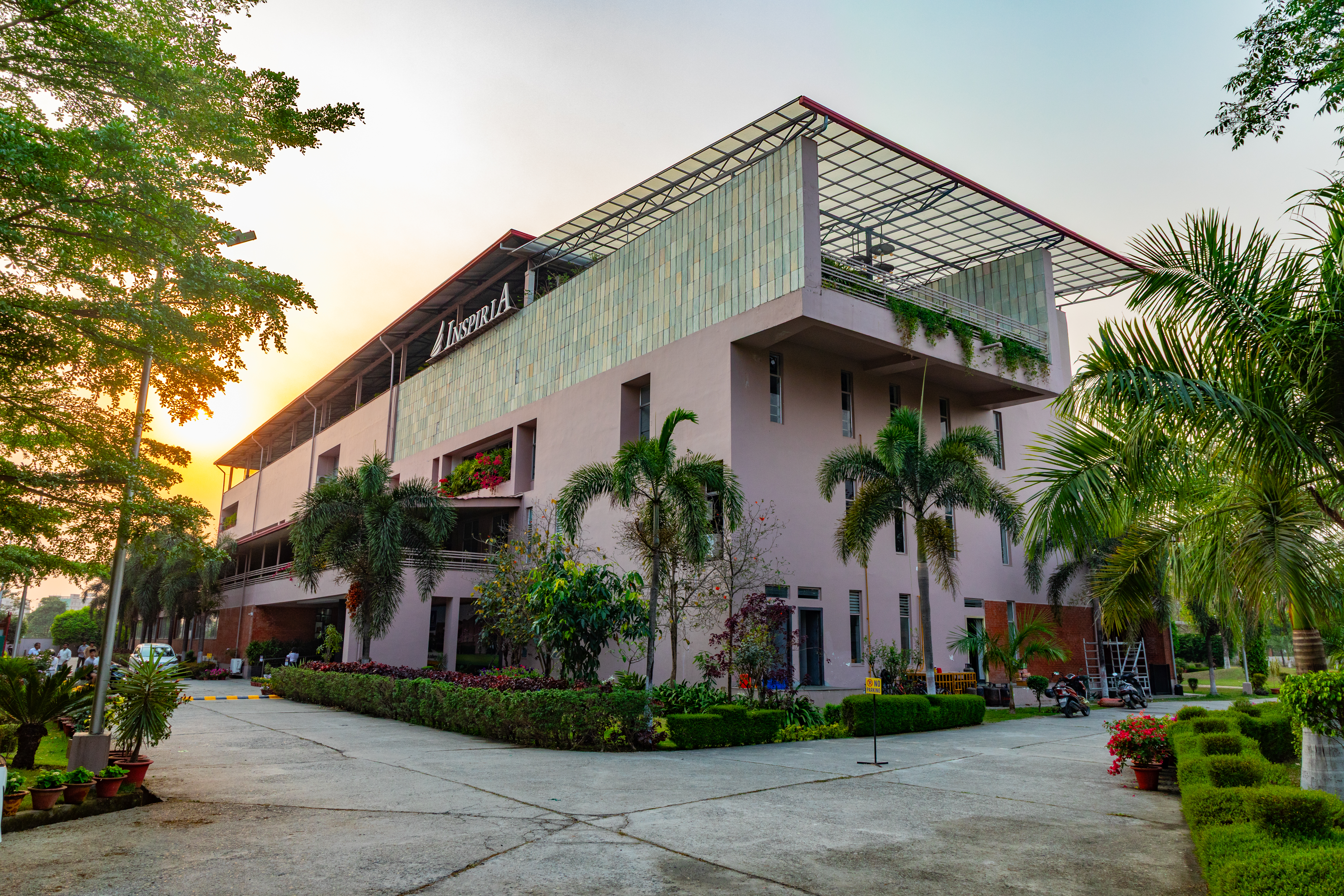
Main College Campus

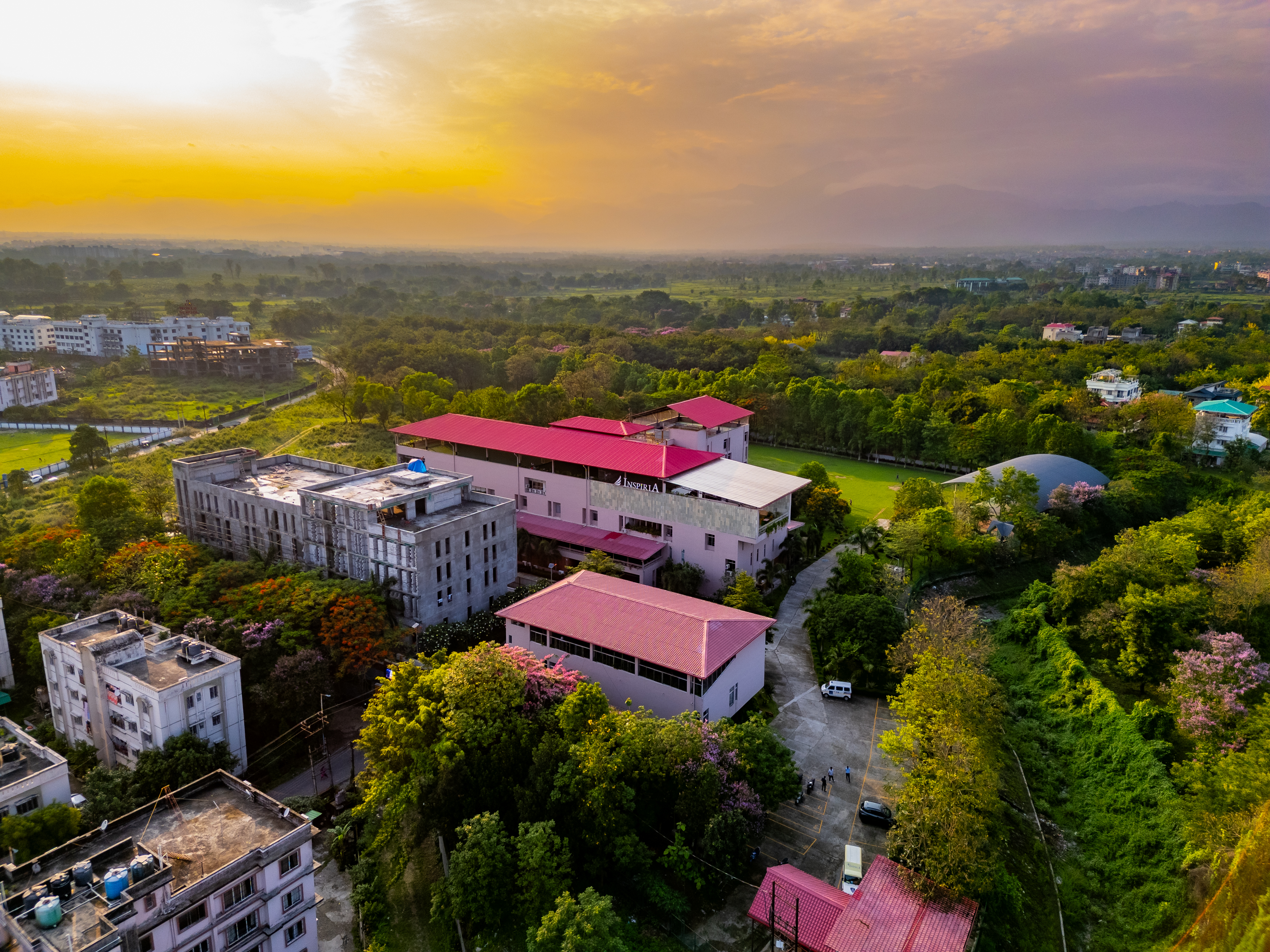
Aerial View

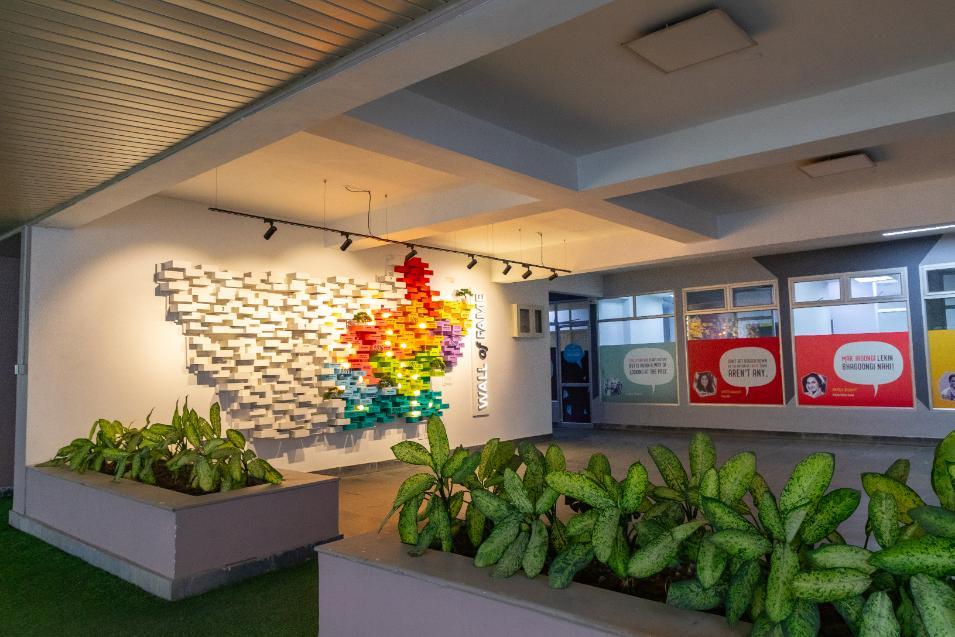
Wall Of Fame

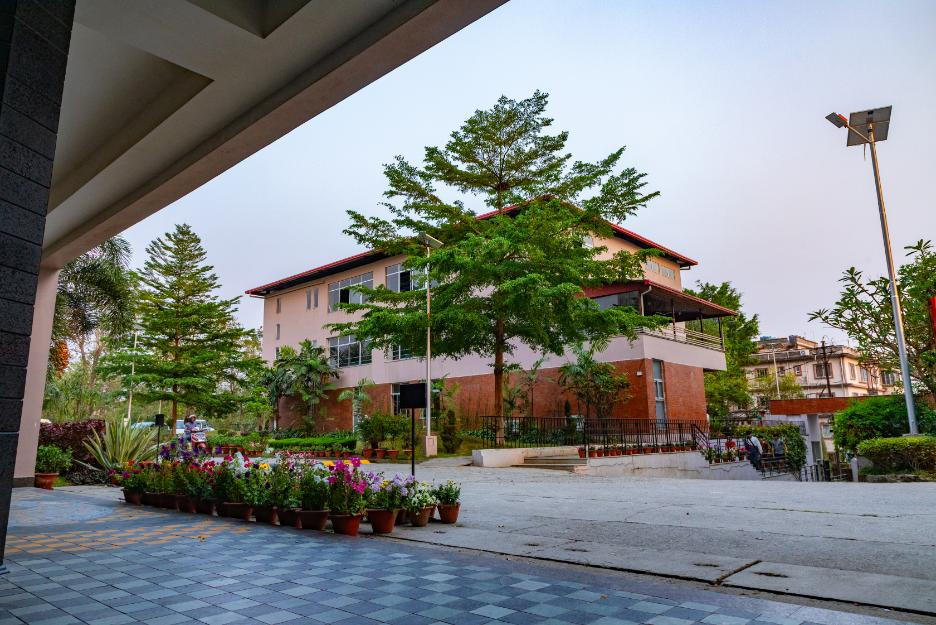
Campus Entry Point

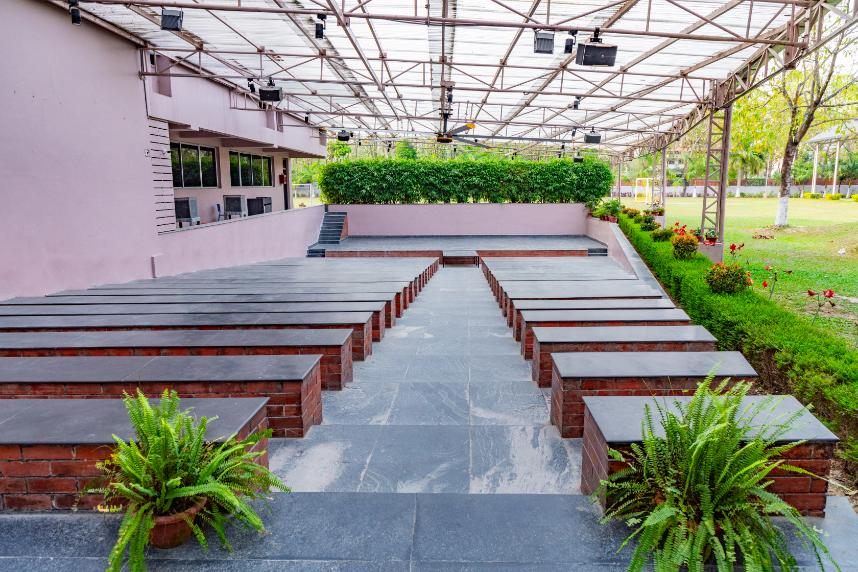
Amphitheatre

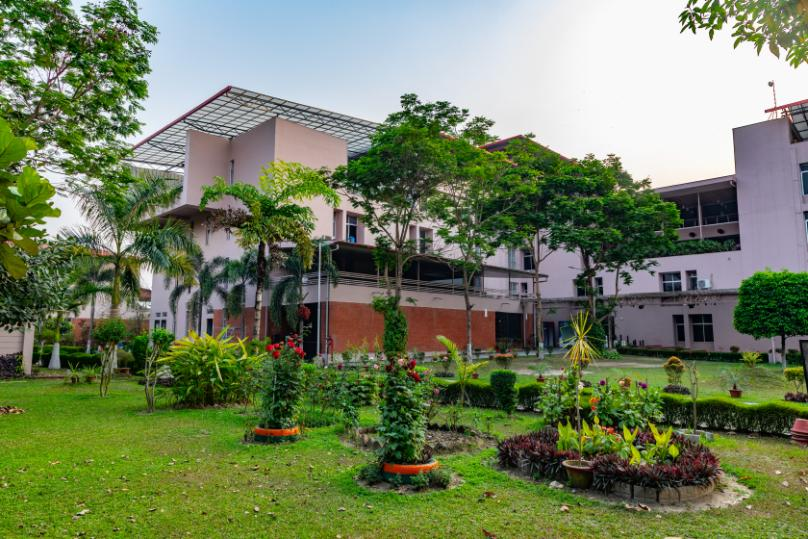
Campus Back Side

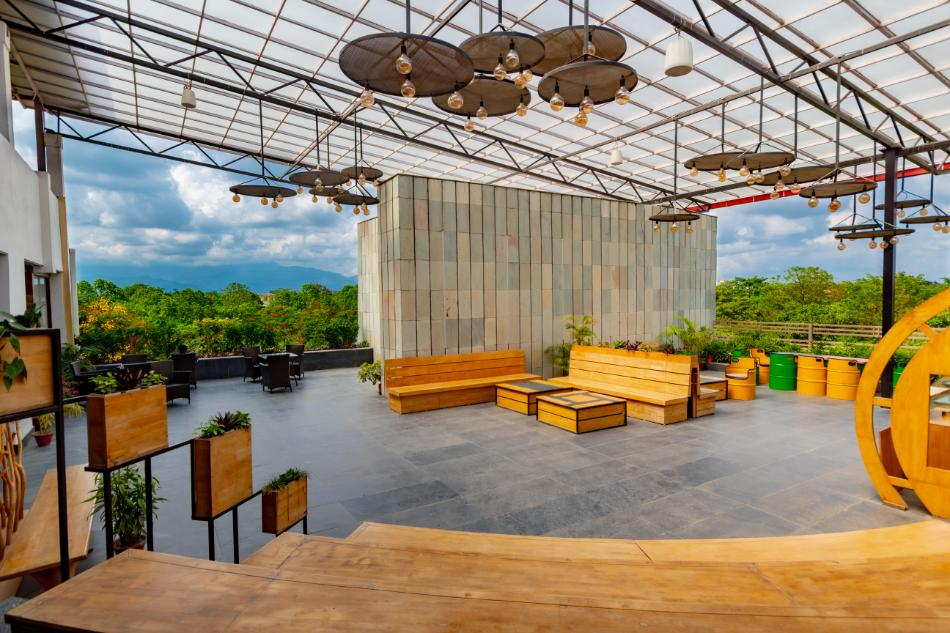
Innovation Garden

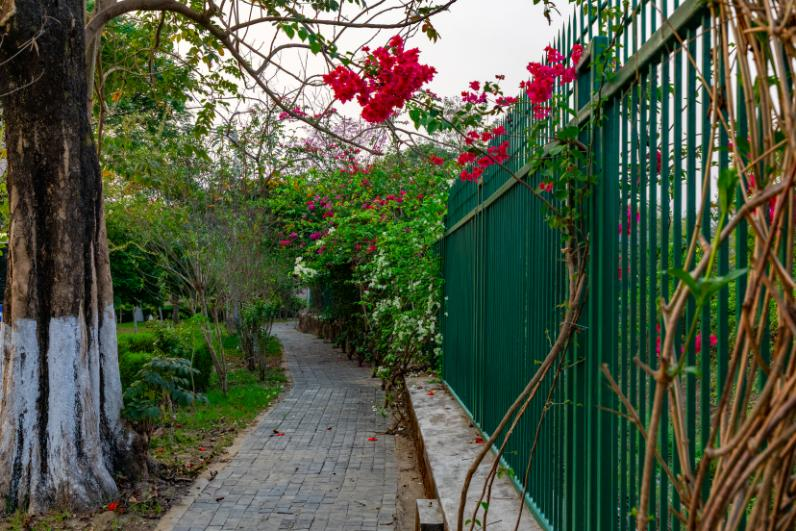
Campus Garden Area

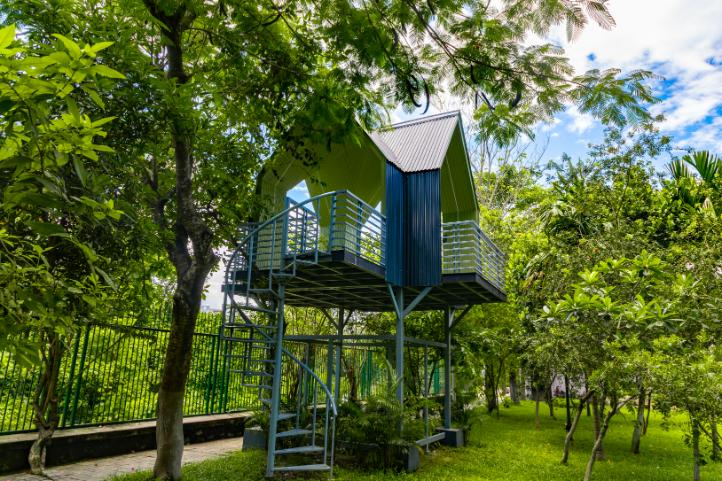
Campus Garden Area

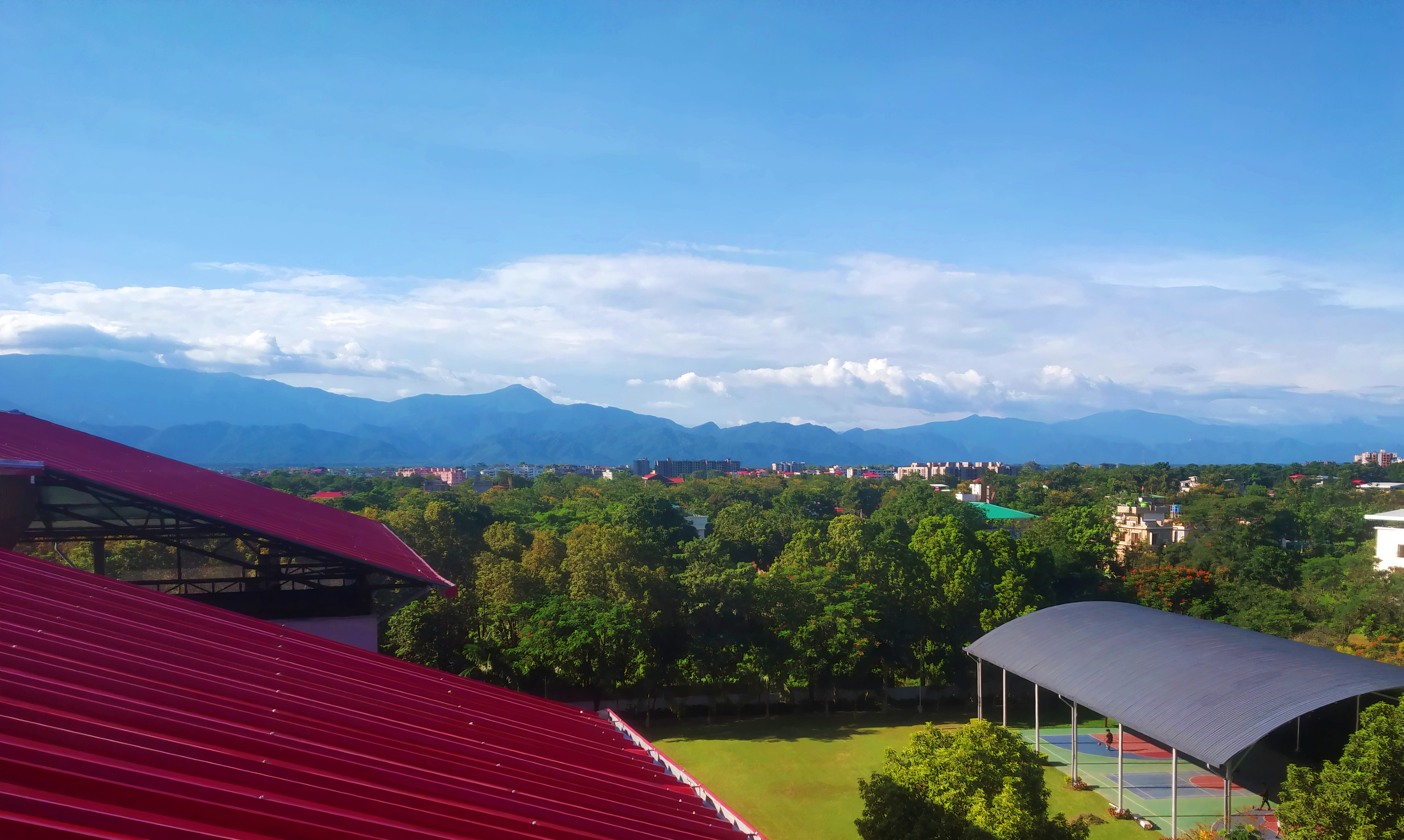
Mountain View From Campus

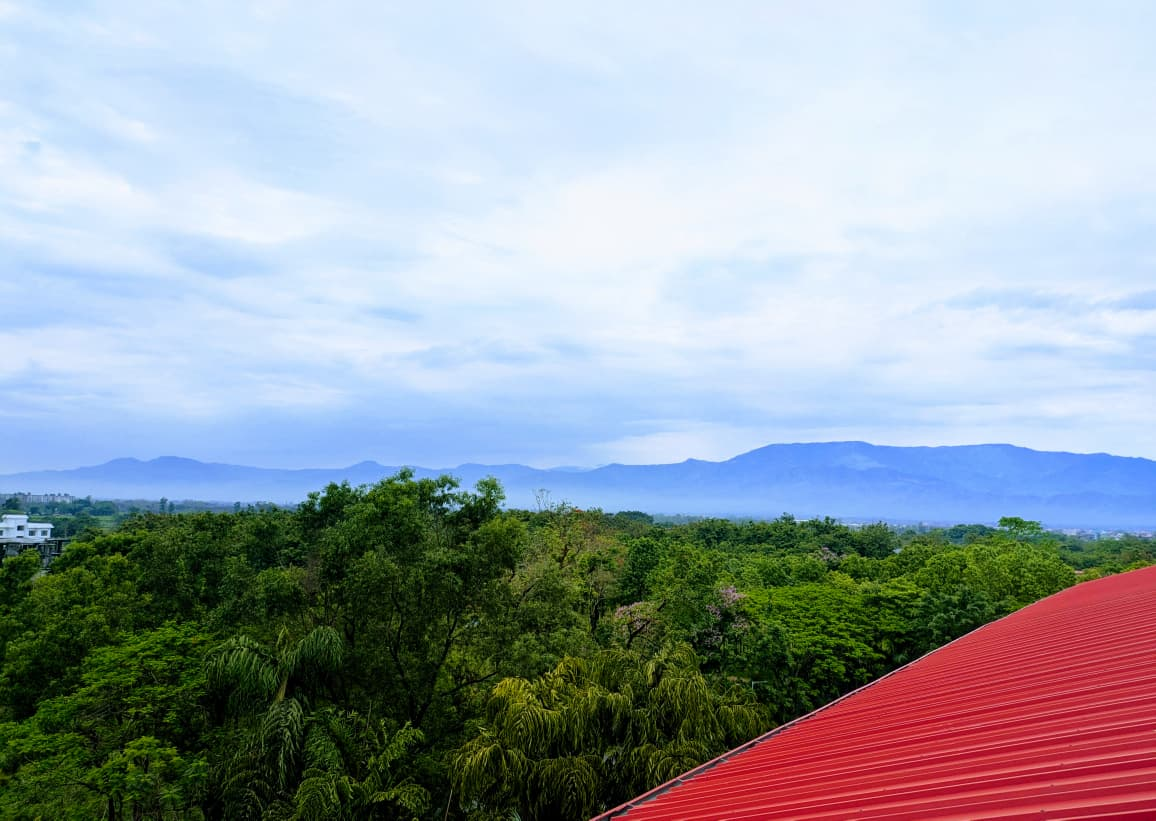
Mountain View From Campus

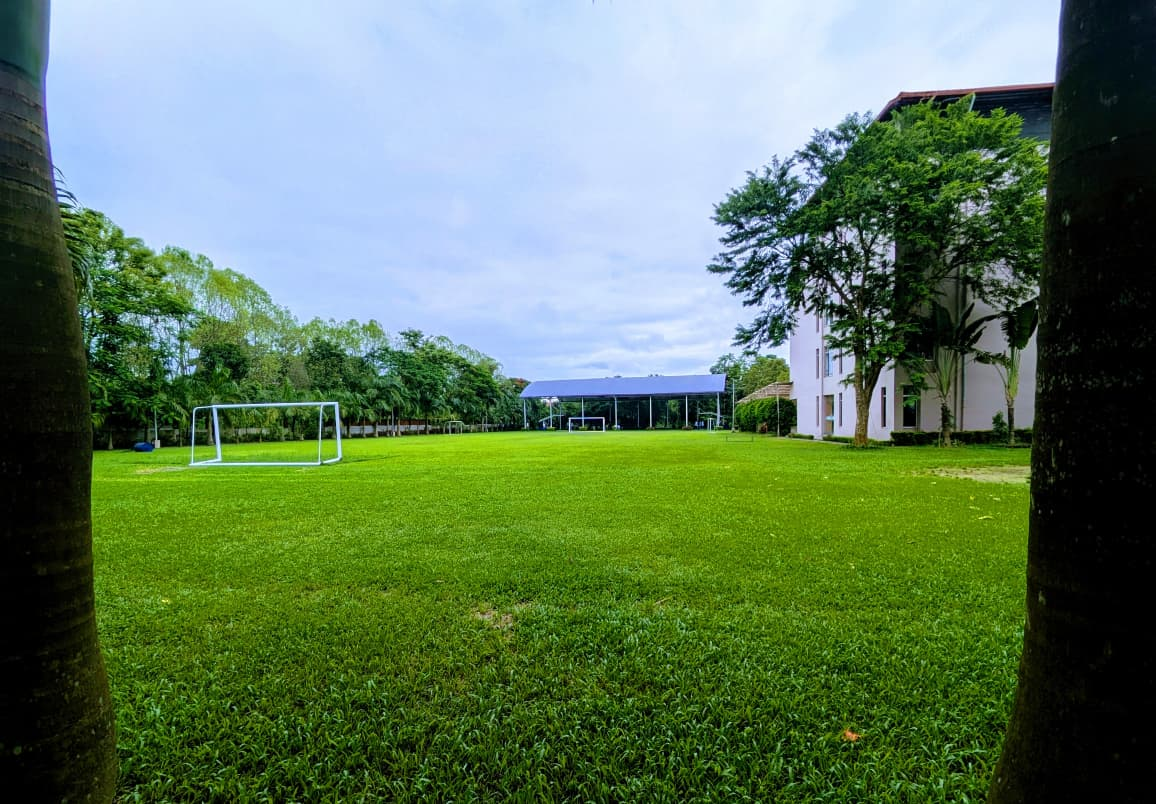
Inspiria Campus Ground

== Events and Activities ==
- Insvaganza: Annual fest showcasing creativity and culture.
- Corporenza: A themed event blending mythology and management.
- Art and Design Festival: Celebrating creativity across media and design disciplines.
- Esperanza: North Bengal’s premier media fest.
- YouthRun: North Bengal’s Most Vibrant Running Event.
- Techstars Startup Weekend: The event provides a forum for aspiring entrepreneurs to experience startup life.
- InspiriaQ: North Bengal’s largest inter-school quiz competition.
- TEDxInspiria Knowledge Campus: Rising from the Foothills: Wellness, Wisdom & Tech-Driven Futures.

== See also ==
- List of institutions of higher education in West Bengal
- Education in India
- Education in West Bengal
- Higher education in West Bengal

== Sources ==
- Inspiria Knowledge Campus Secures Prestigious NAAC Accreditation
- Inspiria Art & Design Festival 2025 Wraps Up with 500+ Exhibits and a Thrilling Design-o-Thon
- Inspiria Knowledge Campus Drives Career Awareness to Remote Regions with Innovative 'Career Awareness on Wheels' Initiative
- Insvaganza 2025: Inspiria Knowledge Campus Gears Up for a Grand Cultural Extravaganza!
- Inspiria Knowledge Campus Leads Educational Innovation with Student-Led Soft Skills, Employability Skills, and Personality Development Program
- Corporenza 2025: A Journey Through Mythology and Management
- Esperanza 4.0 to Highlight in Media Innovations and Sustainability Efforts
- Inspiria Toastmasters Club
- TEDxInspiria Knowledge Campus
