= Abdur Rauf Danapuri =

Indian Islamic scholar and political figure (d. 1948)

Abu al-Barakat Abdur Rauf Danapuri
- Born: c. 1874; Danapur, Patna district, Bengal, British India
- Died: 20 February 1948 (aged 73–74); Kolkata, India
- Resting place: Peshawari Cemetery, Maniktala
- Occupation(s): Islamic scholar, physician, writer, political figure
- Organizations: Jamiat Ulema-e-Hind, Muslim League, Jamiat Ulema-e-Islam
- Known for: Religious scholarship, political activism, medical practice
- Notable work: Asaḥḥu as-Siyar

Abu al-Barakat Abdur Rauf Danapuri (c. 1874 – 20 February 1948) was an Islamic scholar, writer, physician, and political figure from British India. He was involved in religious scholarship, social work, and the Indian independence movement.

== Early life and education ==
Abdur Rauf Danapuri was born in c. 1874 in Danapur, near Patna, Bihar. His early education took place in Danapur and Agra, followed by higher studies in Lucknow and Hyderabad. His father, Abdul Qadir, was known as a scholar.

== Career ==
=== Religious and scholarly contributions ===
Danapuri was involved in religious debates and legal interpretations. He participated in discussions on Islamic jurisprudence, including issues related to marriage laws. His major works included Asaḥḥu as-Siyar, a two-volume book on Islamic history and biography, and Sīrat-e-Nabawī.

=== Political involvement ===
Danapuri was involved in India's independence movement and opposed British rule. In 1921, he was arrested along with Maulana Azad and Subhas Chandra Bose and was imprisoned for six months. He was initially associated with Jamiat Ulema-e-Hind but later joined the Muslim League and Jamiat Ulema-e-Islam.

=== Medical Practice and Social Work ===
Danapuri was elected president of Anjuman-e-Atibba in Kolkata. His efforts contributed to the recognition of the association's Board of Faculty by the Bengal government. He was offered the position of principal at a newly established medical college in Bihar, which he declined.

== Death and legacy ==
Danapuri died on 20 February 1948 in Kolkata at the age of 74. He was buried at Peshawari Cemetery, Maniktala.
