= Nalanda Mahila College =

Coordinates: 25.19622°N 85.52146°E

- नालंदा महिला महाविद्यालय
- Type: Undergraduate College
- Location: Biharsharif, Nalanda district, Bihar, India
- Affiliations: Patliputra University
- Website: nalandamahilacollege.ac.in

Nalanda Mahila College, is a general degree women's colleges in Biharsharif, Bihar. It is a constituent unit of Patliputra University. College offers undergraduate courses in science and arts.

== Departments ==
=== Science ===
- Chemistry
- Physics
- Mathematics
- Zoology
- Botany

=== Arts ===
- English
- Hindi
- Economics
- Political Science
- Philosophy
- Psychology
- History

== Accreditation ==
Nalanda Mahila College was accredited by the National Assessment and Accreditation Council (NAAC).
