= G.J. College, Bihta =

General degree college in Bihar

Sri Gadadhar Acharya Janta College
- श्री गदाधर आचार्य जनता महाविद्यालय
- Type: Undergraduate College
- Established: 1958
- Affiliations: Patliputra University
- Location: Rambagh, Bihta, Patna district, Bihar, India
- Campus: Rural
- Website: gjcollegebihta.ac.in

G.J. College, Bihta, also known as Sri Gadadhar Acharya Janta College, established in 1958, is a general degree college in Ramgarh, Bihta, Bihar. It is a constituent unit of Patliputra University. College offers undergraduate courses in science, commerce, and arts.

== Departments ==
=== Science ===
- Chemistry
- Physics
- Mathematics
- Zoology
- Botany
- Computer Science

=== Arts ===
- English
- Hindi
- Economics
- Political Science
- Philosophy
- Psychology
- History
