= B.D. College, Patna =

Academic institution in Bihar, India

Bhuwaneshwari Dayal College
- भुवनेश्वरी दयाल महाविद्यालय
- Motto: तमसो मा ज्योतिर्गमय
- Motto in English: From Darkness, lead me to light
- Type: Professional Degree College
- Established: 10 March 1970 (56 years ago)
- Affiliations: Patliputra University
- Principal: Prof. Ratna Amrit (2025)
- Location: B.D Collage, Road Mithapur, Patna, Bihar, India
- Campus: Urban
- Accreditation: NAAC Grade B+
- Website: bdcollegepatna.ac.in

B.D. College, Patna, also known by as Bhuwaneshwari Dayal College, established in 1970, is a Professional Degree colleges in Patna, Bihar. It is a constituent unit of Patliputra University. College offers undergraduate courses in Science, Commerce and Arts. This college runs as per UGC and is controlled by Bihar State Education Department Act.

== Departments ==
=== Science ===
- Chemistry
- Physics
- Mathematics
- Zoology
- Botany

=== Arts & Commerce ===
- English
- Hindi
- Urdu
- Sanskrit
- Prakrit
- Maithili
- Economics
- Political Science
- Philosophy
- History
- Geography
- Ancient Indian History & Archeology
- Psychology
- Commerce

== Accreditation ==
B.D. College, Patna was accredited by the National Assessment and Accreditation Council (NAAC) with 'B' grade.

== Gallery ==
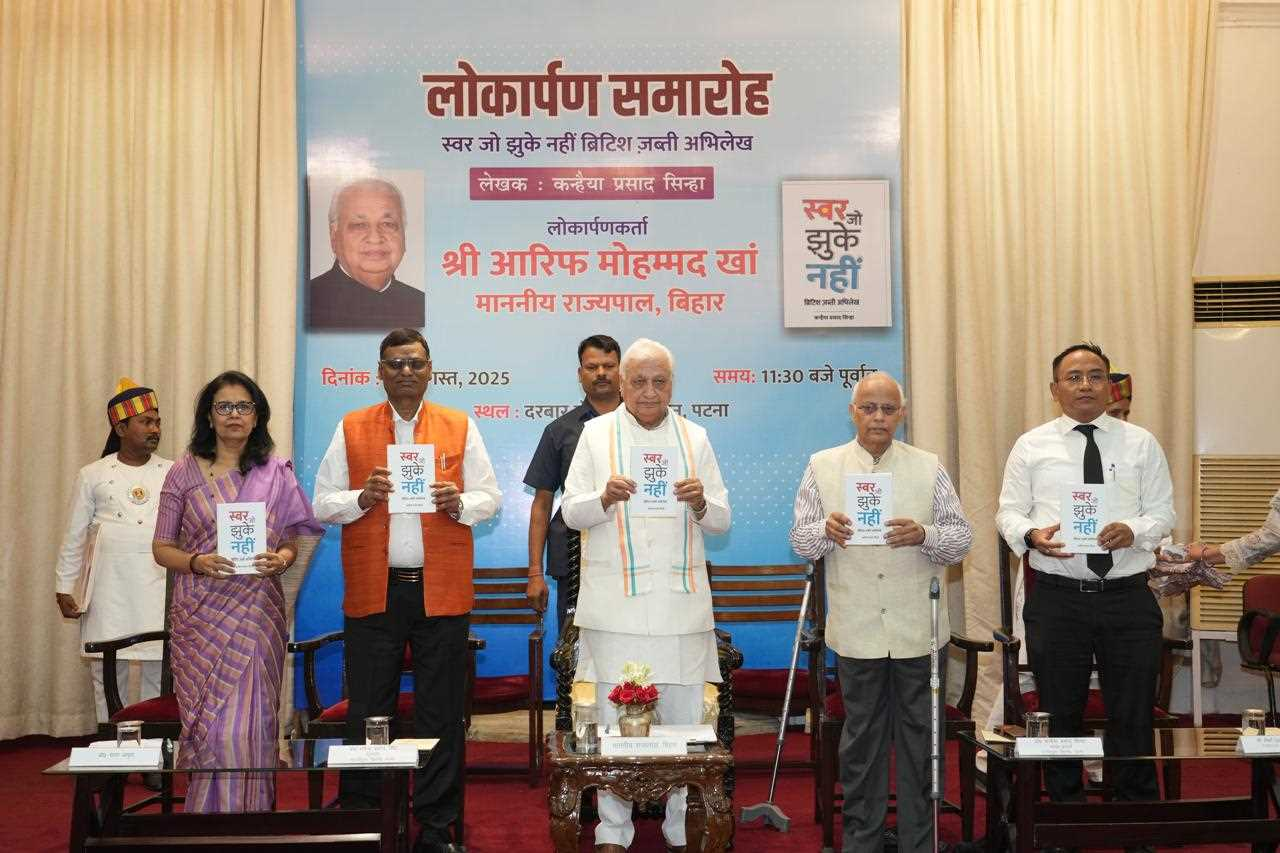
B.D. College, Patna

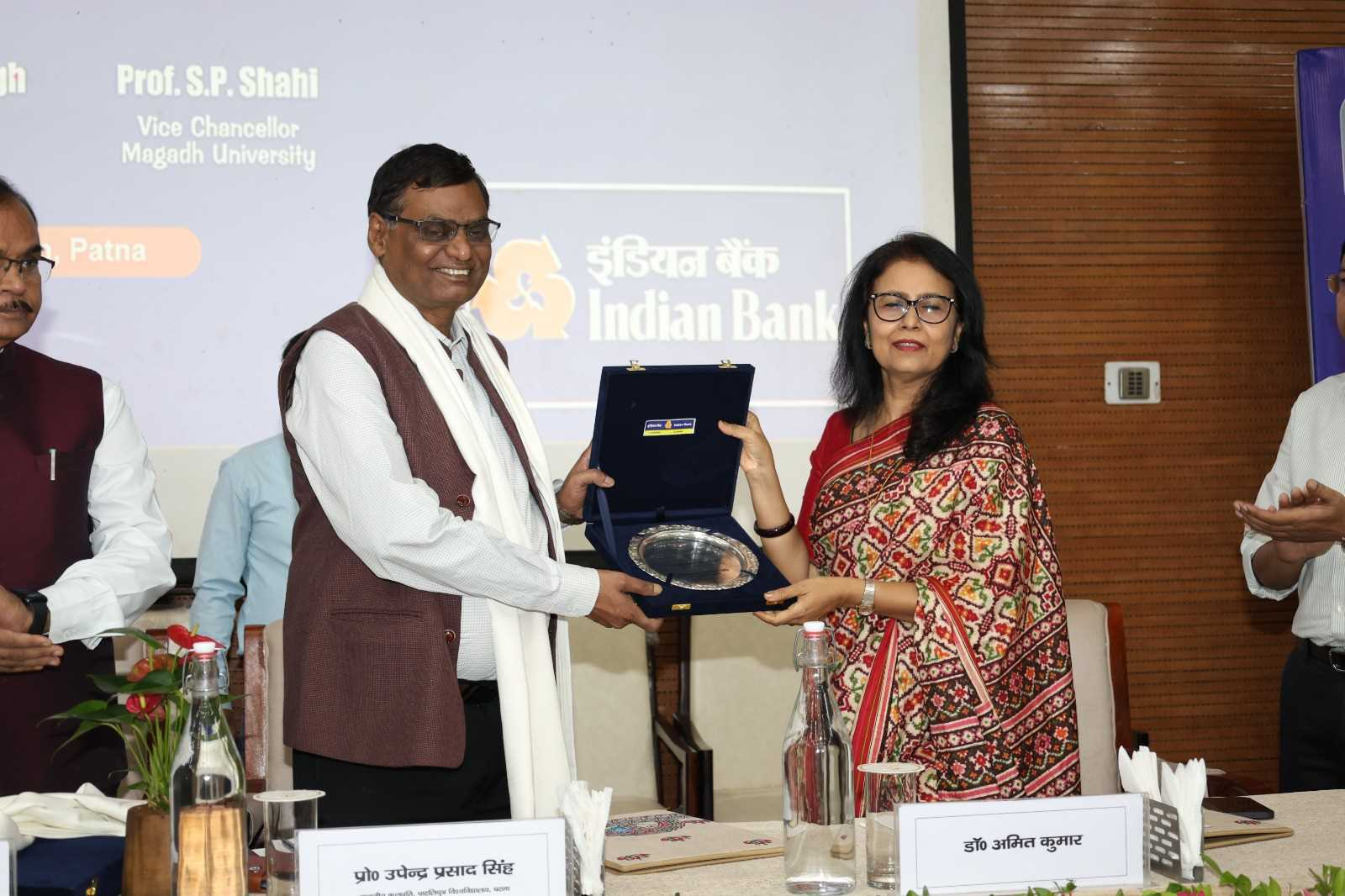
B.D. College, Patna

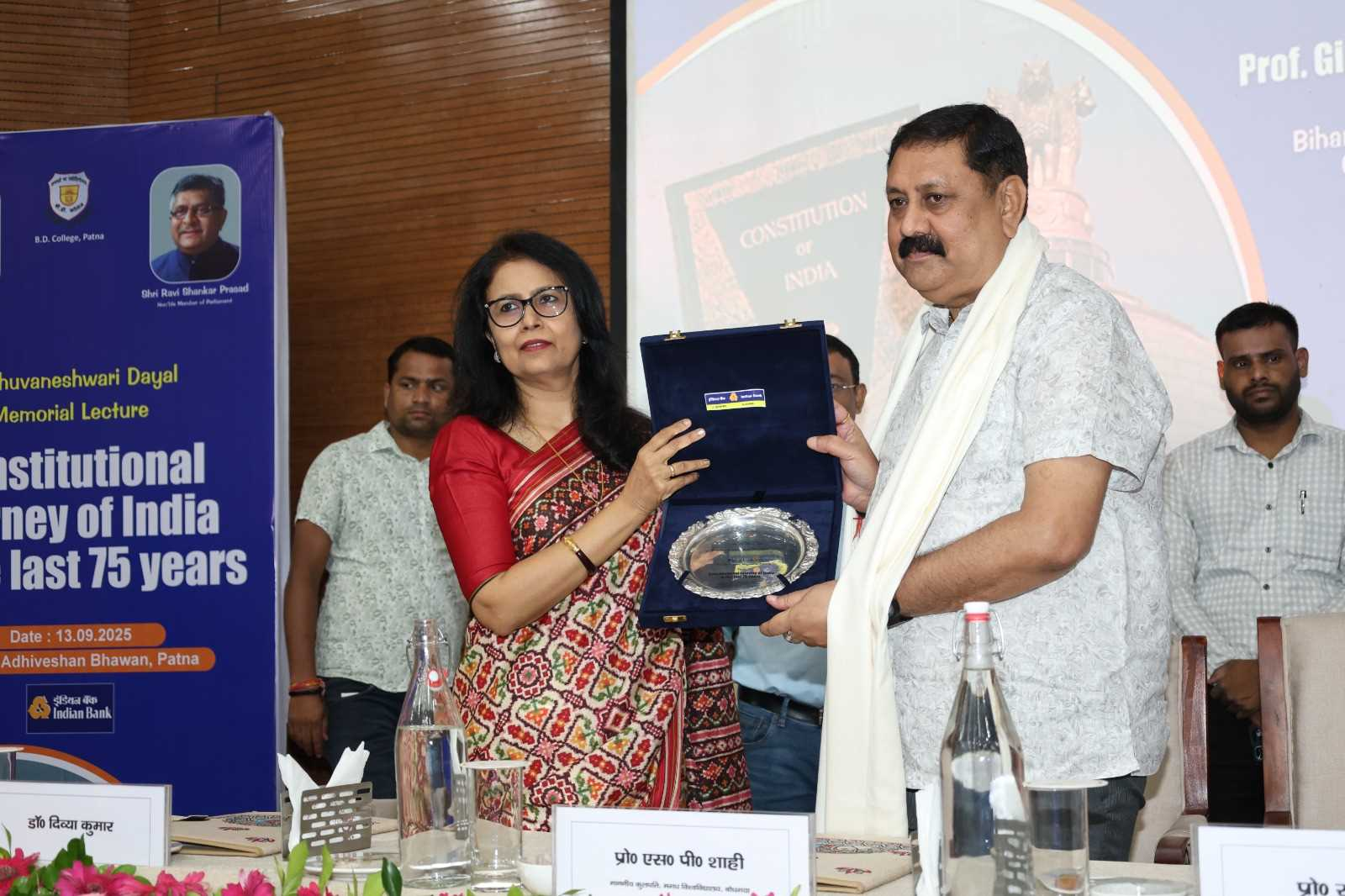
B.D. College, Patna

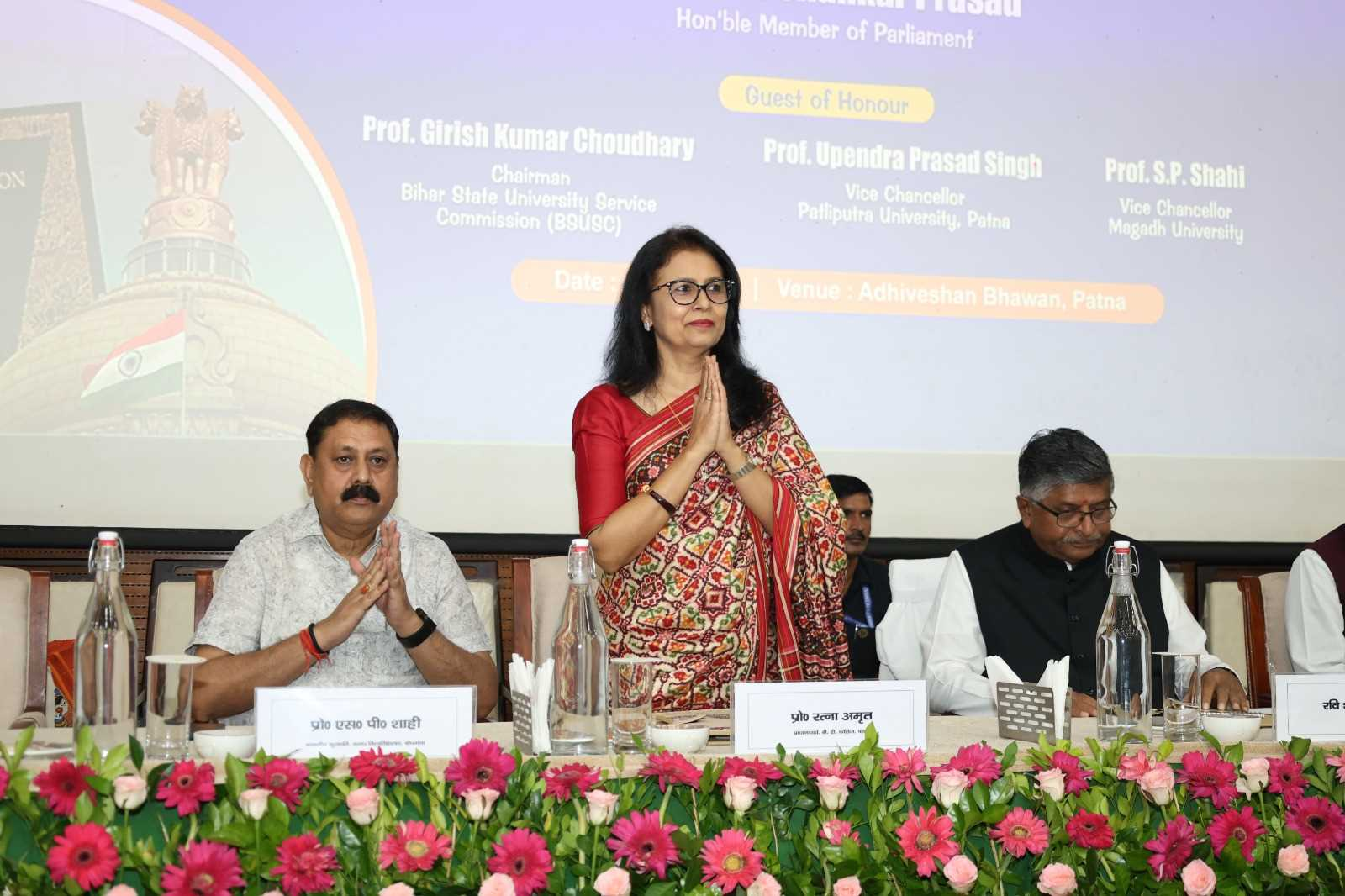
Principal, B.D. College, Patna
