= Danapur =

Indian city in Patna district, Bihar

Danapur Dinapore/Dinapur, Danapur Nizamat
- City
- Location in Bihar, India Danapur (India) Danapur (Bihar)
- Coordinates: 25°37′21″N 85°02′30″E
- Country: India
- State: Bihar
- Division: Patna
- District: Patna
- UA: Patna
- Ward: 40 wards
- Established: 1887

Government
  - Type: Nagar Parishad
  - Body: Nagar Parishad Danapur Nizamat
  - MLA: Ram Kripal Yadav (BJP)
  - MP: Misa Bharti (RJD)

Population (2011)
  - Total: 182,241

Languages
  - Official: Hindi
  - Regional: Magadhi
- Time zone: UTC+5:30 (IST)
- PIN: 801503
- Telephone code: 06115
- ISO 3166 code: IN-BR
- Vehicle registration: BR-01
- Civic agency: Patna Regional Development Authority
- Website: danapur.biharurban.in

Danapur Nizamat or Danapur is an Indian satellite town and one of six subdivisions (tehsil) in the Patna district of Bihar state. The population was 182,241 at the 2011 India Census. It is part of the Patna Metropolitan Region. It was constituted as a municipality in 1887. Danapur is also a shelter and hatchery for the migrating Siberian cranes, locally called Janhgil. They visit every year during the monsoon season for breeding and leave this place before the start of the winter season. The Sub-Area Headquarters of Bihar and Jharkhand is situated in the army cantonment here.

In 2018, Bihar State Road Development Corporation Limited (BSRDCL) completed the construction work of a ten- metre-wide 10.6 km long road along the western embankment of Digha-Danapur canal (Rupaspur canal). This road also passes underneath the 12.27 km long Digha-AIIMS elevated road (Patli Path) that connects NH-98 near AIIMS Patna to Digha on the Loknayak Ganga Path (or Patna Marine Drive) at Patna. The Danapur–Bihta–Koilwar Elevated Corridor is an under-construction 23.5 km to 25.08 km four-lane highway project in Bihar, designed to ease severe traffic congestion and improve connectivity to the upcoming Bihta Civil Airport.

Flagstaff ghat on the Ganges at Dinapur, Patna, 1859 is one of the oldest ghats. Gurdwara Handi Sahib, a gurdwara of Guru Tegh Bahadur, is a pilgrimage place for Sikhs. Naulakha Temple and various historical buildings of British rule are places of interest.

== Administration ==
The Danapur sub-division (Tehsil) is headed by an IAS or State Civil Service Officer of the rank of Sub Divisional Magistrate (SDM).

=== Blocks ===
The Danapur Tehsil is divided into 4 Blocks, each headed by a Block Development Officer (BDO).

List of Blocks is as follows:

1. Danapur
2. Maner
3. Bihta
4. Naubatpur

==== List of villages ====
The list of villages in Danapur-cum-Khagaul Block (under Danapur Tehsil) is as follows: (GP is Gram Panchayat).

| Village name | Land area (hectares) | Population (in 2011) |
|---|---|---|
| Adampur | 70 | 1,371 |
| Asopur | 73 | 2,342 |
| Babakkarpur | 62 | 1,042 |
| Bari Khagaul | 40 | 4,554 |
| Birbhan Chak | 36 | |
| Bishunpur | 133 | 2,144 |
| Dalip Chak | 1,031 | |
| Dariapur | 162 | 2,964 |
| Dhibra | 51 | 1,334 |
| Faridanpur | 3 | 953 |
| Ganghara (GP) | 1,540 | 8,205 |
| Gorgawan | 93 | 1,961 |
| Habaspur | 70 | 4,733 |
| Harsham Chak | 226 | 2,800 |
| Hathia Kandh (GP) | 506 | 8,369 |
| Hetanpur (GP) | 229 | 5,312 |
| Jafarpur | 46 | 826 |
| Jamsaut (GP) | 275 | 11,196 |
| Kafarpur | 21 | 1,069 |
| Kasim Chak (GP) | 197 | 1,722 |
| Kedalpura | 103 | 1,639 |
| Khedarpura | 28 | 1,167 |
| Kothawan (GP) | 100 | 3,201 |
| Kothia | 61 | 1,529 |
| Lakhani Bigha (GP) | 193 | 4,985 |
| Lodipur | 205 | 3,000 |
| Madhopur | 278 | 3,765 |
| Mainpura | 126 | 2,447 |
| Maksudpur | 72 | 1,936 |
| Mobarakpur (GP) | 166 | 4,775 |
| Mustafapur | 170 | 2,357 |
| Nasirpur | 26 | 67 |
| Panapur (GP) | 1,992 | 26,310 |
| Patlapur (GP) | 119 | 3,288 |
| Sandalpur | 34 | |
| Sarari (GP) | 248 | 4,269 |
| Shankarpatti | 622 | 432 |
| Shankarpur Khas | 138 | 2,026 |
| Taufir Mangar Pal | 243 | |
| Usri | 104 | 3,430 |
| Usri Khurd | 43 | 1,389 |
| Gola Road | 1163 | 7,284 |

== Demographics ==
Historical population
| Year | Pop. | ±% |
|---|---|---|
| 1991 | 84,616 | — |
| 2001 | 131,176 | +55.0% |
| 2011 | 182,241 | +38.9% |

Religions in Dinapur
| Religion | Percent |
| Hindus | 92.72% |
| Muslims | 6.48% |
| Others | 0.81% |

As of the census of 2011, there were 182,241 with 97,129 men and 85,112 women residing in the city. Out of which 25,092 (13.77%) had children under the age of 6. There were 13,398 boys while 11,694 are girls. The population density as per 2001 data is about 113 persons/ha. The overall literacy rate is 78.4%, with the male literacy rate being 84.54% and the female literacy rate being 71.39%. The sex ratio of 882 per 1000 males was lower than the national average of 944. And child sex ratio of girls is 873 per 1000 boys.

== Geography ==
Danapur is located on the bank of the River Ganges.

According to the City development plan for Danapur, the city has a total area of 11.63 km^{2} and is divided into 40 wards.

== Politics ==
Danapur is part of Danapur Assembly constituency under the Pataliputra Lok Sabha constituency.

== Education ==
=== Colleges ===
- Dr. B.R. Ambedkar Institute of Dental Sciences & Hospital
- BS College, Danapur
- R.P. Sharma Institute of Technology

=== Schools ===
- Gyan Niketan, VVC Complex, Gola Road
- St Dominic Savios High School
- Army Public School, Danapur Cantt
- Kendriya Vidyalaya Danapur Cantt
- Dr. Dukhan Ram DAV Public School, Gola Road
- [St. Karen's High School, Patna]
- Children's Academy, Bailey Rd, Saguna More, Mainpura, Danapur

== Nagar Parishad Danapur Nizamat ==
Nagar Parishad Danapur Nizamat looks after municipal works of Danapur area. The Nagar Parishad Danapur Nizamat (Municipal Council) was established in 1889. There are 40 wards under jurisdiction of Nagar Parishad Danapur Nizamat.

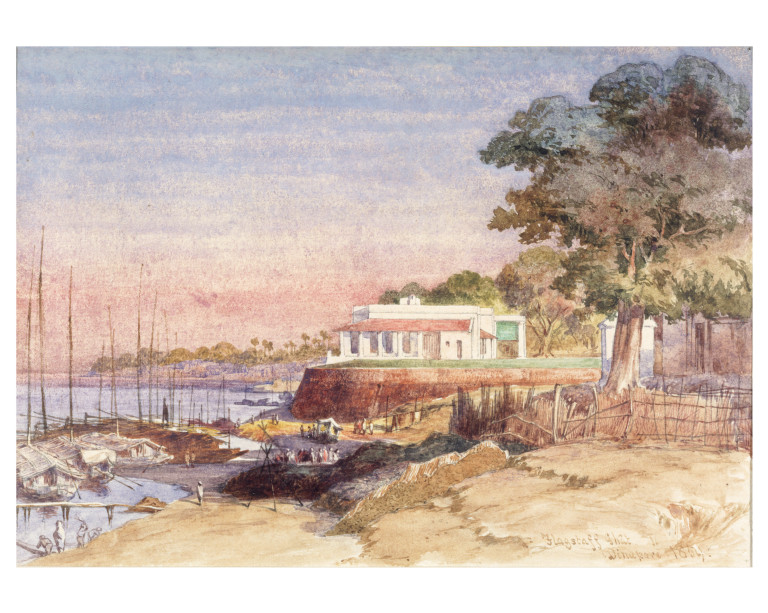
Flagstaff ghat in 1859

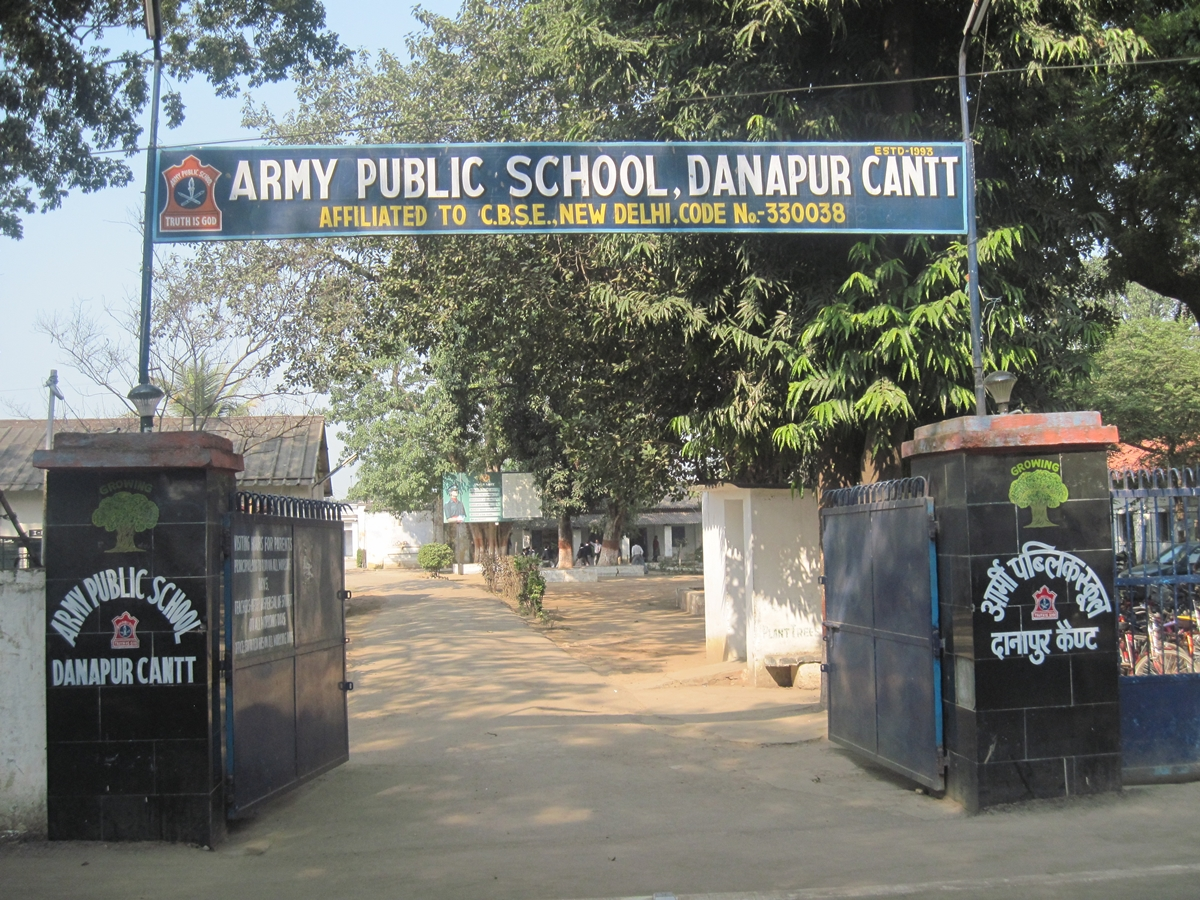
Army Public School, Danapur Cantt

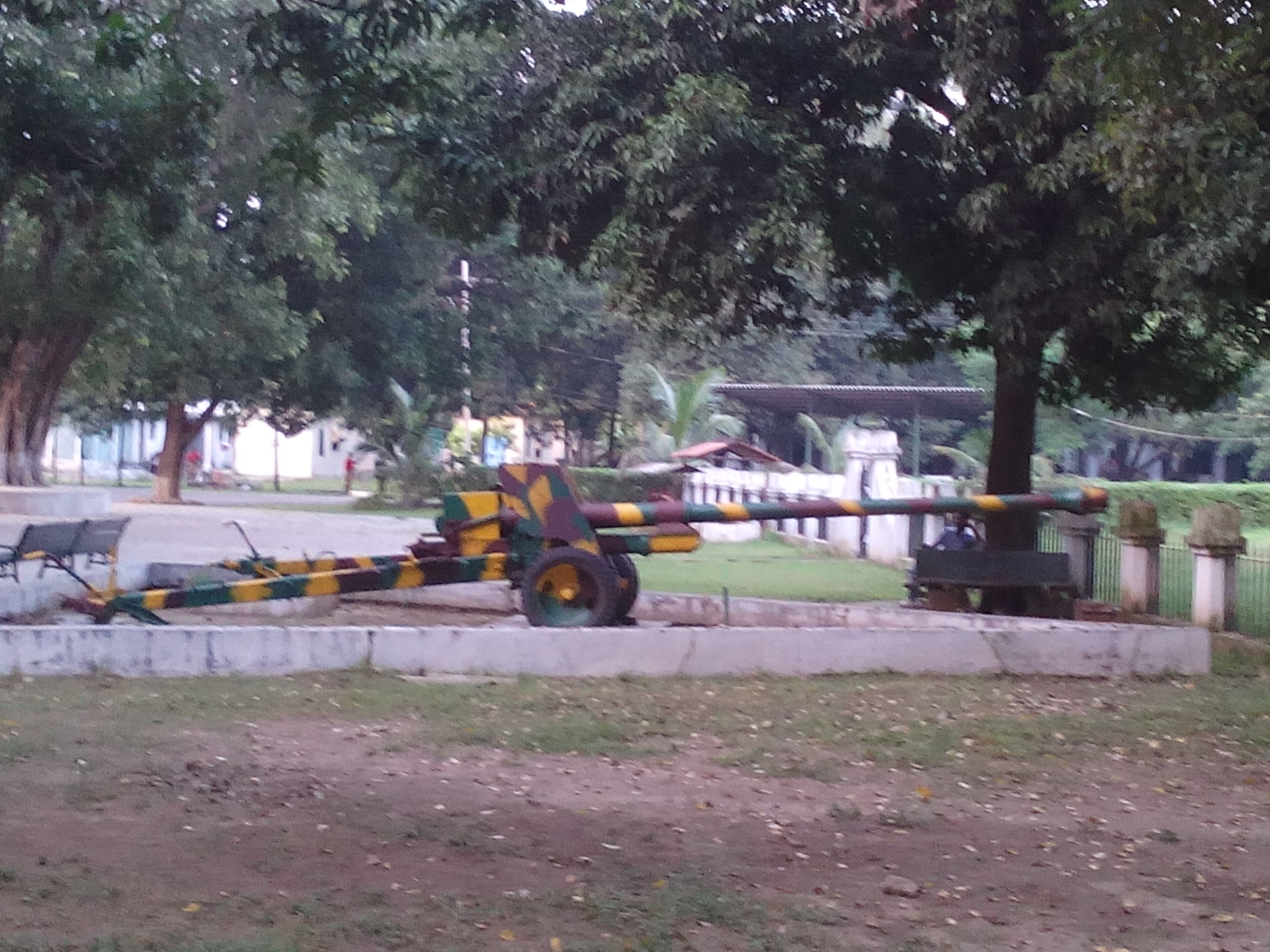
Danapur Army Cantonment

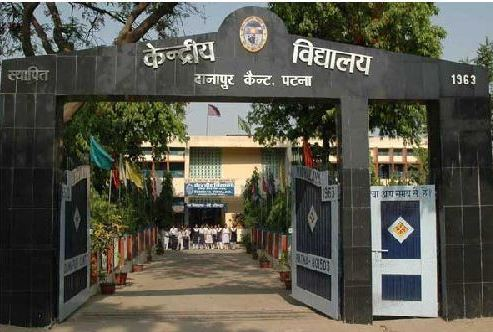
Kendriya Vidyala Danapur Cantt

== Notable people ==
- Abdur Rauf Danapuri (1874–1948), Indian Islamic scholar and political figure

== See also ==
- Bihta
- Danapur Cantt
- Khagaul
- Maner Sharif
