= Patliputra University =

Public university in Patna, Bihar, India

Coordinates: 25.602493°N 85.159128°E

- पाटलिपुत्र विश्वविद्यालय
- Official logo of Patliputra University
- Motto: योग: कर्मसु कौशलम् Sanskrit
- Motto in English: Excellence in the Action
- Type: Public
- Established: March 18, 2018; 8 years ago
- Affiliations: UGC
- Chancellor: Governor of Bihar
- Vice-Chancellor: Upendra Prasad Singh
- Students: 3,50,000 (Approx)
- Location: Old Bypass Road, Kankarbagh, Patna, Bihar, 800020, India
- Campus: Urban
- Website: ppup.ac.in

Patliputra University (PPU) is a collegiate public state university located in Patna, Bihar, India. It was established in 2018 by the Government of Bihar. The university has jurisdiction over colleges in the Patna and Nalanda districts, except those affiliated with Patna University. As a collegiate university, its functions are shared between the university departments and its affiliated institutions. The headquarters is situated at Kankarbagh, Patna, while a permanent campus is under development near Bakhtiyarpur.

== History ==
In 2015, Bihar's education minister indicated that Magadh University (MU) might be divided into two or three universities due to the difficulties in managing its large number of affiliated colleges. In July of the same year, the then vice-chancellor of MU, Mohammad Ishtiyaque, decided to strengthen the university's Patna branch office to reduce the need for students to visit the headquarters at Bodh Gaya. As part of this process, a committee was established to oversee the expansion and development of the Patna branch office.

On 30 July 2016, the Bihar cabinet approved the Bihar State Universities (Amendment) Bill, 2016, which paved the way for the creation of Patliputra University by bifurcating Magadh University.

In October 2017, a notice was issued inviting applications for the posts of vice-chancellor and pro-vice-chancellor. More than 150 professors applied for these posts. On 19 March 2018, Bihar governor Satya Pal Malik appointed Girish Kumar Choudhary as pro-vice-chancellor and Gulab Chand Ram Jaiswal as vice-chancellor of Patliputra University under the Bihar State University (Amendment) Act, 1976.

== Academics ==
Admitted students of Magadh University (MU) will be awarded degrees by the MU. The university started operating academically from the 2018–19 academic year. The programmes being offered at the university be the same as the ones being offered at Magadh University.

The university plans to launch postgraduate departments in science, commerce and arts stream at university level after many of the postgraduate departments went to MU after the bifurcation. Some of Patna's better institutions come under Patliputra University after its creation.

== Administration ==
As of September 2025, Upendra Prasad Singh serves as the vice-chancellor of the university, while Ganesh Mahto continues as the pro-vice-chancellor.

The Governor of Bihar acts as the chancellor of Patliputra University.

Abubakar Rizvi serves as the registrar, and Manoj Kumar is the proctor.

== Campus ==
The university is headquartered in Patna and administratively operate from Magadh University branch office on Kankarbagh old bypass in the Rajendra Nagar neighbourhood of Patna, whilst, its permanent campus will be located at Bakhtiyarpur.

Patliputra University's PG campus will be built in BS College, Danapur, then Vice Chancellor Prof. RK Singh inspected the BS College regarding the construction of PG campus.

== Colleges ==
The university's jurisdiction extends over two districts, Nalanda and Patna.

=== Constituent colleges ===
==== Patna district ====
| # | College | Location |
|---|---|---|
| 1 | Anugrah Narayan College | Patna |
| 2 | A.N.S. College | Barh |
| 3 | B.D. College | Patna |
| 4 | B.S. College | Danapur |
| 5 | College Of Commerce, Arts & Science | Patna |
| 6 | G.J. College | Bihta |
| 7 | Ganga Devi Mahila College | Patna |
| 8 | J.D. Women's College | Patna |
| 9 | Jagat Narain Lal College | Khagaul |
| 10 | M.M. College | Bikram |
| 11 | Mahila College | Khagaul |
| 12 | Malti Dhari College | Naubatpur |
| 13 | R.L.S.Y. College | Bakhtiyarpur |
| 14 | R.P.M. College | Patna City |
| 15 | Ram Krishna Dwarika College | Patna |
| 16 | Ram Ratan Singh College | Mokama |
| 17 | S.M.D. College | Punpun |
| 18 | Sri Arvind Mahila College | Patna |
| 19 | Sri Guru Gobind Singh College | Patna |
| 20 | T.P.S. College | Patna |

==== Nalanda district ====
| # | College | Location |
|---|---|---|
| 1 | Government Degree College | Rajgir |
| 2 | Kisan College | Nalanda |
| 3 | Nalanda College | Biharsharif |
| 4 | Nalanda Mahila College | Biharsharif |
| 5 | S.P.M. College | Udantpuri |
| 6 | S.U. College | Hilsa |

=== Government colleges ===
==== Patna district ====
| # | College | Location |
|---|---|---|
| 1 | Govt. Women's College, Gardnibagh, Patna | Gardnibagh, Patna |
| 2 | Rajkiya Mahila Mahavidyalaya, Gulzarbagh, Patna | Gulzarbagh, Patna |

=== Minority colleges ===
==== Patna district ====
| # | College | Location |
|---|---|---|
| 1 | Oriental College | Patna City |

==== Nalanda district ====
| # | College | Location |
|---|---|---|
| 1 | Sogara College, Biharsharif | Biharsharif |
| 2 | Allama Iqbal College, Biharsharif | Biharsharif |

=== Affiliated colleges ===
==== Patna district ====
| # | College | Location |
|---|---|---|
| 1 | Awadhesh Prasad Mahavidyalaya | (Nadaul / Patna) |
| 2 | B B M B G Kanya College | Patna |
| 3 | B L P College, Masaurhi | Masaurhi |
| 4 | Bansropan Ram Bahadur Singh Yadav College, Kanhauli | Kanhauli |
| 5 | Chandradeo Prasad Verma College, Simri | Simri |
| 6 | D N College, Masaurhi | Masaurhi |
| 7 | Dr. C P Thakur College, Naubatpur | Naubatpur |
| 8 | Jyoti Kunwar College, Fatehpur | Fatehpur |
| 9 | Kameshwar Prasad Singh College, Nadwan | Nadwan |
| 10 | L P Shahi College, Patna | Patna |
| 11 | Nunwati Jagdev Singh College, Bakhtiyarpur | Bakhtiyarpur |
| 12 | P L S College, Masaurhi | Masaurhi |
| 13 | P N K College, Achhua | Achhua |
| 14 | Patna Muslim Science College | Patna |
| 15 | R P College, Datiyana, Bikram | Datiyana, Bikram |
| 16 | R L S Y College | Anisabad, Patna |
| 17 | R L S Y College | Paliganj, Patna |
| 18 | R P S College, Bailey Road | Bailey Road, Patna |
| 19 | R P S Mahila College, Bailey Road | Bailey Road, Patna |
| 20 | Ram Roop Prasad College | (Patna) |
| 21 | S K M V College, Fatuha | Fatuha |
| 22 | S N A Evening College, Barh | Barh |
| 23 | Sant Sandhya Das Mahila College, Barh | Barh |
| 24 | Sir Ganesh Dutt Memorial College | Patna |
| 25 | Sri Bhuwaneshwari Raja College, Barh | Barh |
| 26 | Sri Ram Narayan College, Barh | Barh |
| 27 | Trimurti College, Ismailpur | Ismailpur |

==== Nalanda district ====
| # | College | Location |
|---|---|---|
| 1 | L.S.T. Gramin Mahavidyalaya, Aungaridham | Aungaridham |
| 2 | B.R. Degree College | (Nalanda) |
| 3 | Deo Sharan Women's Evening College, Sohsarai | Sohsarai |
| 4 | Dr. Ram Raj Singh Mahila Mahavidyalaya, Chandi | Chandi |
| 5 | G D M College, Harnaut | Harnaut |
| 6 | K S T College, Sohsarai | Sohsarai |
| 7 | Magadh Mahavidyalaya, Chandi | Chandi |
| 8 | Mahabodhi Mahavidyalaya, Nalanda | Nalanda |
| 9 | Mahatma Budh Hiraman College | (Nalanda) |
| 10 | Mata Ashapuri Mahavidyalay | (Nalanda) |
| 11 | Nalanda Sodh Sansthan | (Nalanda) |
| 12 | P M S College, Paharpura | Paharpura |
| 13 | R Lal College, Nalanda | Nalanda |
| 14 | RLSY College, Nalanda | Biharsharif |
| 15 | R P S College, Harnaut | Harnaut |
| 16 | S P College, Hilsa | Hilsa |
| 17 | S.P. Verma College, Rajakuan, Biharsharif | Biharsharif |
| 18 | Snatak College, Nalanda | Nalanda |
| 19 | Vardhman Mahavir College, Pawapuri | Pawapuri |

=== Medical & Paramedical colleges ===
==== Patna district ====
| # | College | Location |
|---|---|---|
| 1 | Indian Institute of Health Education & Research | Patna |

=== Education colleges ===
==== Patna district ====
| # | College | Location |
|---|---|---|
| 1 | A B C College of Education, Neura, Patna | Neura, Patna |
| 2 | Al-Fatima Educational Society B.Ed. College, Gonpura, Phulwarisharif | Gonpura, Phulwarisharif |
| 3 | Baldeo College of Education, Fatehpur | Fatehpur |
| 4 | Bibi Aasia Begum Teacher's Training College | Patna |
| 5 | Bihar College of Teacher Education, Samanpura, Raja Bazar | Samanpura, Raja Bazar |
| 6 | Deo Nagina Teacher Training College, Mohiuddinpur, Masaurhi | Masaurhi |
| 7 | Islamia Teacher's Training (B.Ed.) College, Phulwarisharif | Phulwarisharif |
| 8 | K.S College of Professional Education, Neura, Danapur | Neura, Danapur |
| 9 | Kamleshwari Prasad Singh Teacher Training College, Bakhtiyarpur | Bakhtiyarpur |
| 10 | Krishna College of Teacher's Training, Nagwan, Naubatpur | Nagwan, Naubatpur |
| 11 | L N M College of Education, Lodipur, Maner | Lodipur, Maner |
| 12 | Leeds Training College, Mahuli, Parsa Bazar | Mahuli, Parsa Bazar |
| 13 | M.S Institute Of Education (MSIE), Khagaul | Khagaul |
| 14 | Maa Bidhya Maa Kusum Teacher's Training College, Paliganj | Paliganj |
| 15 | Maa Tara Institute of Technology Education, Beldarichak | Beldarichak |
| 16 | Mirza Ghalib Teacher's Training College, Raja Bazar | Raja Bazar |
| 17 | Mothers International T.T. College, Phulwarisharif | Phulwarisharif |
| 18 | National Teacher's Training College, Khajanchi Road | Patna |
| 19 | Nezamia College of Education, Jamaluddin Chak, Khagaul | Khagaul |
| 20 | Patliputra Teacher's Training College, Alinagar, Anisabad | Anisabad |
| 21 | Pratibha Pallvan Teacher's Training College, Masaurhi | Masaurhi |
| 22 | R.P.S. Teacher's Training College, New Beli Road | Patna |
| 23 | Raghunandan Teacher's Training College, Mathiyapur, Danapur | Danapur |
| 24 | Ram Dei Ram Chandra Memorial Shikshan Sansthan, Dhanarua | Dhanarua |
| 25 | Ram Rup Prasad B.Ed. College, Bhergawan, Dhanarua | Dhanarua |
| 26 | Sanjay Singh B.Ed. College, Bikram | Bikram |
| 27 | Sattar Memorial College of Education, Phulwarisharif | Phulwarisharif |
| 28 | Sattayam International Institute of Higher Studies, Gaurichak | Gaurichak |
| 29 | Scholars College Education, Bihta | Bihta |
| 30 | Shivam College of Higher Studies, Phulwaria | Phulwaria |
| 31 | Shivam Teachers Training College | Patna |
| 32 | Shivpuri Devi Teacher's Training College, Bihta | Bihta |
| 33 | Sushila Sujata B.Ed. College, Gonpura | Gonpura |
| 34 | Tagore Teacher's Training College, Bikram | Bikram |
| 35 | Takshila College of Education, Phulwarisharif | Phulwarisharif |
| 36 | Tapindu Institute of Higher Studies, Khagul | Khagual / Patna |
| 37 | Vidya College of Professional Studies, Rasulpur, Varuna | Rasulpur |
| 38 | Vidya Niketan Teacher's Training College, Charman, Masaurhi | Masaurhi |
| 39 | Vitthal College of Education, Baily Road | Baily Road, Patna |

==== Nalanda district ====
| # | College | Location |
|---|---|---|
| 1 | D P Singh Institute of Education, Gautam Nagar, Sohsarai | Sohsarai |
| 2 | Gautam T.T. College, Bhaganbigha, Sohsarai | Bhaganbigha, Sohsarai |
| 3 | J. P. Teacher's Training College, Viyawan, Biharsharif | Biharsharif |
| 4 | Maa Bachchan Devi Teacher's Training College, Arawa | Arawa |
| 5 | Maha Bodhi Mahavidyalaya Teacher's Training (B.Ed.) | Nalanda |
| 6 | Mata Sushila Institute Of Education, Hilsa | Hilsa |
| 7 | Nalanda Mahila Shikshak Prashikshan Mahavidyalaya, Deepnagar | Biharsharif |
| 8 | Nalanda Teacher's Training College, Deepnagar, Biharsharif | Biharsharif |
| 9 | Ram Kripal Singh Teacher's Training College, Harnaut | Harnaut |
| 10 | Rural Teacher's Training College, Shekhpura, Chandi | Shekhpura |
| 11 | S.A. College of Education, Sikandara, Silao | Silao |
| 12 | Shanti memorial College of Education, Pirpar, Begampur | Begampur |
| 13 | Sukhdeo Narayan Lal Bahadur Sitaram Memorial B.Ed. College, Mustafabad Malti | Mustafabad Malti |
| 14 | V S Group of Colleges, Parwalpur | Parwalpur |
| 15 | Vikramaditya College of Education, Parwalpur | Parwalpur |

=== Law colleges ===
==== Patna district ====
| # | College | Location |
|---|---|---|
| 1 | Ambedkar Law College | Patna |
| 2 | Bihar Institute of Law | Patna |
| 3 | College Of Commerce, Law College (Cocas) | Patna |
| 4 | Himalaya Law College | Patna |
| 5 | Impact College of Law | Patna |
| 6 | M.G.M. College Of Law | Patna |
| 7 | R P S Law College, New Bailey Road, Danapur | Danapur |

==== Nalanda district ====
| # | College | Location |
|---|---|---|
| 1 | J. P. College of Law | Biharsharif |

=== Vocational colleges ===
==== Patna district ====
| # | College | Location |
|---|---|---|
| 1 | Admerit College, Western Campus, Sri Krishnapuri, Boring Road | Patna |
| 2 | Arcade Business College, Khagaul Road | Patna |
| 3 | Arcade Business College, Rajendra Nagar | Patna |
| 4 | Catalyst College | Patna |
| 5 | Catalyst Institute of Management & Advanced Global Excellence, S.K. Puri | Patna |
| 6 | International Business College | Patna |
| 7 | M.G.M. College | Patna |
| 8 | Maa Sharda College of Technical Education & Research | Patna |
| 9 | Oxford Business College | Patna |
| 10 | Swatantrata Senani Shankarlal Agarwal Prabandhan Sah Takniki Mahavidyalay | Patna |

== Controversies ==
- In August 2018, an investigation committee of 5 members was constituted by Vice Chancellor Prof. Gulab Chand Ram Jaiswal to probe the charges of misbehaviour and irregularities against the then registrar of university Col. (Retd.) Kamesh Kumar. The committee was formed due to non-satisfactory reply of a showcause notice issued to the registrar previously. Rather than answering, he questioned several decisions taken by the university at that time. He allegedly confronted the VC and pro-VC on various issues related to academics and outsourcing of the security staff for the university. The committee was asked to submit its report in a day or two so that it could be finally sent to the Raj Bhavan for necessary directives in the matter from then chancellor cum Governor of Bihar, Satya Pal Malik.
- On October 15, 2019, the university issued notice to JD Women's College, asking it to make arrangements for starting PG department on the third floor of arts block of the college - a college fully reserved for girls. The university's letter caused unrest among college students. Hundreds of students staged protest demonstrations in college premises against the university's decision to admit male students in post-graduation courses from current academic session in a fully reserved girls' college. Soni, then president of JD Women's Students Union, said, “Entry of male students in the college campus would hamper safety and peaceful environment of the college. Various Student's Unions like Chhatra JDU, AISF etc of other colleges also supported the protest. University's pro-vice-chancellor Girish Kumar Choudhary said, “The building selected for PG department has a separate entrance gate. The university was looking for space in all constituent colleges to start PG courses. JD women's college has a newly constructed building which has vacant space. University asked for this only for temporary instance. For zero interference of PG department into college campus, the university is ready to barricade the space. Also, class timings will be coordinated so that PG classes should start after departure of UG classes". He accused politically affiliated students’ unions for politicising the decision for grabbing attention.
