= J.D. Women's College =

Janki Devi Women's College
- जानकी देवी महिला महाविद्यालय
- Motto: Aloft be the torch of learning
- Type: Undergraduate College
- Established: 1971 (54 years ago)
- Location: Patna, Bihar, India
- Accreditation: NAAC Grade B
- Affiliations: Patliputra University
- Website: www.jdwcpatna.com

J.D. Women's College (Janki Devi Women's College), established in 1971, is a general degree women's colleges in Patna, Bihar, India. It is a constituent unit of Patliputra University. The college offers undergraduate courses in science, arts as well as vocational courses (BCA, BBM).

== Location ==
J.D. Women's College is located in the city of Patna in front of Patna Zoo.The college covers a large area and is near the Sardar Patel Vawan.

== Departments ==
The college offers undergraduate academic courses in the following disciplines.

=== Science ===
- Chemistry
- Physics
- Mathematics
- Zoology
- Botany

=== Arts ===
- English
- Hindi
- Bengali
- Urdu
- Sanskrit
- Economics
- Political Science
- Philosophy
- Psychology
- History
- Sociology
- Home Science
- Music
- Geography
- BCA Department
- BBM Department

== Accreditation ==
J.D. Women's College was accredited Grade 'B' by the National Assessment and Accreditation Council.
