= RLSY College Aurangabad =

Degree college in Bihar

- Ram Lakhan Singh Yadav College Aurangabad
- Established: 1971; 55 years ago
- Affiliations: Magadh University
- Principal: Dr.Ganesh Mahto
- Location: G.T Road, Aurangabad district, Bihar, 824101, India
- Website: www.rlsycollegeaurangabad.in

RLSY College Aurangabad also known as Ram Lakhan Singh Yadav College Aurangabad is a degree college in Aurangabad district of Bihar, India. It is Constituent College of Magadh University

== Degrees and courses ==
- Intermediate Of Arts
- Intermediate Of Science
- B.A.
- B.Sc.
- Vocational Courses
- code 24002

== Campus ==
- The college is situated on a five-acre plot of land.
