= Khagaul =

Indian city in Patna district, Bihar

- Urban
- Location in Patna, Bihar, India Khagaul (Bihar) Khagaul (India)
- Coordinates: 25.58°N 85.05°E
- Country: India
- State: Bihar
- District: Patna

Government
  - Type: Nagar Parishad
  - Body: Khagaul Nagar Parishad
  - Member Of Parliament: Misa Bharti (RJD)
  - Member Of Legislative Assembly: Ram Kripal Yadav (BJP)

Area
  - Total: 3 km^{2} (1.2 sq mi)
- Elevation: 55 m (180 ft)

Population (2021)
  - Total: 34,364
  - Density: 11,000/km^{2} (30,000/sq mi)

Languages
  - Official: Magahi, Hindi
- Time zone: UTC+5:30 (IST)
- PIN: 801105
- Vehicle registration: BR
- Website: patna.nic.in

Khagaul is a city and a municipality in Patna district in the Indian state of Bihar. It is a part of the Danapur-cum-Khagaul block of Patna.

== Overview ==
Khagaul is an ancient city and was an ancient observatory under Mauryan rule. Nagar Parishad city in the district of Patna, Bihar. The Khagaul city is divided into 27 wards for which elections are held every five years.

Khagaul Nagar Parishad has total administration of over 7,951 houses to which it supplies basic amenities like water and sewerage. It is also authorized to build roads within Nagar Parishad limits and impose taxes on properties coming under its jurisdiction.

== Demographics ==
As of 2001 India census, Khagaul had a population of 48,330. Males constituted 53% of the population and females 47%. Khagaul had an average literacy rate of 71.5%. In Khagaul, 13% of the population was under 6 years of age.

As of 2011 India Census, The Khagaul Nagar Parishad had a population of 44,364 of which 23,492 are males while 20,872 are females.

The population of children with age 0-6 is 5198 which is 11.72% of the total population of Khagaul.

The female Sex Ratio is 888 against the state average of 918.

The literacy rate of Khagaul city is 86.82% higher than the state average of 61.80%. In Khagaul, Male literacy is around 91.81% while the female literacy rate is 81.23%.

== Geography ==
Khagaul is located at 25.58°N 85.05°E. It has an average elevation of 55 metres (180 feet).

== History ==
Khagaul is a historical place. In ancient times, before Christ, Khagaul was called Kusumpura or Kusumpur, near Pataliputra, which was the capital city of the mighty Magadh Empire. Pushpapur was located between Pataliputra and Kusumpur. In modern times Pataliputra is called Patna, whereas Kusumpura or Kusumpur is called Khagaul, and Pushpapur is called Phulwari or Phulwari Shree or Phulwari Sharif.

Shakhtar and Chanakya (also known as Kautilya or Vishnugupta), two famous Prime Ministers of the Magadh Empire belonged to Kusumpur or present-day Khagaul during Fourth Century BC. Chanakya had provided initial education and training to Chandragupta Maurya (Great Emperor of the Magadh Empire and Founder of the Maurya Dynasty) at this very place. Under the guidance of Chanakya, the mighty Magadh Empire was spread from present-day India, Bangladesh, Pakistan, and Afghanistan up to Iran after defeating the forces of Alexander and Seleucus. The tyrannical rule of King Dhanananda over Magadh was brought to an end by the rebellion of Chanakya after his arrest, humiliation, and death sentence inflicted against his father Chanak by the tyrannical King Dhanananda. Thereafter, Chandragupta Maurya, the disciple of Chanakya, was made King-Emperor of the Magadh Empire and Chanakya became its Prime Minister. Chanakya was a great scholar, economist, administrator, jurist, lawmaker, and a very sharp-minded nationalist and shrewd politician. He was a student of Takshashila or Taxila University, and also worked as an Acharya or professor at the same university. Under the guidance of Chanakya, the mighty Magadh Empire had become the most powerful, influential, most developed, and richest empire in the world, and Pataliputra had become the most beautiful city.

After the 5th century AD, Kusumpur was renamed Khagaul after Khagol or Khagol Shastra i.e. Astronomy, as it was an eminent center of Astronomical Observatory (Khagoliya Vedhashala) established by Aryabhata or Aryabhatta for Astronomical Studies and Astronomical Research. Aryabhatta is called Father of Algebra, Geometry and Trigonometry, the Concept of Zero (0), and the decimal system.

Aryabhata, also called Aryabhata I or Aryabhata the Elder (born in the year 476 AD), at Kusumapura, near Pataliputra or present-day Patna in India) was astronomer and the earliest Indian mathematician whose work and history are available to modern scholars. He is also known as Aryabhata I or Aryabhata the Elder to distinguish him from a 10th-century Indian mathematician of the same name. He flourished in Kusumapura—near Pataliputra (Patna), then the capital of the Gupta dynasty—where he composed at least two works, Aryabhatiya (c. 499) and the now lost Aryabhatasiddhanta.

Aryabhatasiddhanta circulated mainly in the northwest of India and, through the Sāsānian dynasty (224–651) of Iran, had a profound influence on the development of Islamic astronomy. Its contents are preserved to some extent in the works of Varahamihira (flourished c. 550), Bhaskara I (flourished c. 629), Brahmagupta (598 – c. 665), and others. It is one of the earliest astronomical works to assign the start of each day to midnight.

Aryabhatiya was particularly popular in South India, where numerous mathematicians over the ensuing millennium wrote commentaries. The work was written in verse couplets and deals with mathematics and astronomy. Following an introduction that contains astronomical tables and Aryabhata's system of phonemic number notation in which numbers are represented by a consonant-vowel monosyllable, the work is divided into three sections: Ganita ("Mathematics"), Kala-kriya ("Time Calculations"), and Gola ("Sphere").

In Ganita Aryabhata names the first 10 decimal places and gives algorithms for obtaining square and cubic roots, using the decimal number system. Then he treats geometric measurements—employing 62,832/20,000 (= 3.1416) for π—and develops properties of similar right-angled triangles and two intersecting circles. Using the Pythagorean theorem, he obtained one of the two methods for constructing his table of sines. He also realized that second-order sine difference is proportional to sine. Mathematical series, quadratic equations, compound interest (involving a quadratic equation), proportions (ratios), and the solution of various linear equations are among the arithmetic and algebraic topics included. Aryabhata's general solution for linear indeterminate equations, which Bhaskara I called kuttakara ("pulverizer"), consisted of breaking the problem down into new problems with successively smaller coefficients—essentially the Euclidean algorithm and related to the method of continued fractions.

With Kala-kriya Aryabhata turned to astronomy—in particular, treating planetary motion along the ecliptic. The topics include definitions of various units of time, eccentric and epicyclic models of planetary motion (see Hipparchus for earlier Greek models), planetary longitude corrections for different terrestrial locations, and a theory of " lords of the hours and days" (an astrological concept used for determining propitious times for action).

Aryabhatiya ends with spherical astronomy in Gola, where he applied plane trigonometry to spherical geometry by projecting points and lines on the surface of a sphere onto appropriate planes. Topics include the prediction of solar and lunar eclipses and an explicit statement that the apparent westward motion of the stars is due to the spherical Earth's rotation about its axis. Aryabhata also correctly ascribed the luminosity of the Moon and planets to reflected sunlight.

The Indian Government named its first satellite Aryabhata (launched 1975) in his honour.
