= Bachelor of Business Management =

Undergraduate program

Bachelor of Business Management (BBM), sometimes known as a fundamentals in marketing, is an undergraduate program of four years. The BBM degree is designed to teach students the skills necessary to perform leadership roles in the business and corporate world. And it is usually classified into 4 majors: marketing management, financial management, operational management, and human resource development management. It is sometimes called Commerce BSCom, for Bachelor of Science in commerce.

== Program content ==
The Bachelor of Business Management program allows students to specialize in a specific academic area including:

- Business Law
- Ethics
- Entrepreneurship
- Finance
- Human resource management
- Management information systems
- Marketing
- Operations management
- Organizational behavior
- Project management
- Strategic management
- Supply chain management
- International business
