= Magadh University =

Public university in Bodh Gaya, Bihar, India

Coordinates: 24.686747°N 84.965133°E

- Motto in English: Knowledge is Eternal
- Type: Public
- Established: 1962; 64 years ago
- Founder: Satyendra Narayan Sinha
- Accreditation: NAAC C
- Affiliations: UGC
- Chancellor: Governor of Bihar
- Vice-Chancellor: Dilip Kumar Kesari (acting)
- Location: Bodh Gaya, Bihar, India
- Campus: Urban
- Website: www.magadhuniversity.ac.in

Magadh University is a public state university and institution of higher education located in Bodhgaya, Bihar. It provides facilities for higher learning and research in the faculties of science, social sciences, humanities and commerce, and has 39 affiliated colleges, 19 constituent colleges and 22 departments.

It was initially established under the Magadh University Act of 1961.

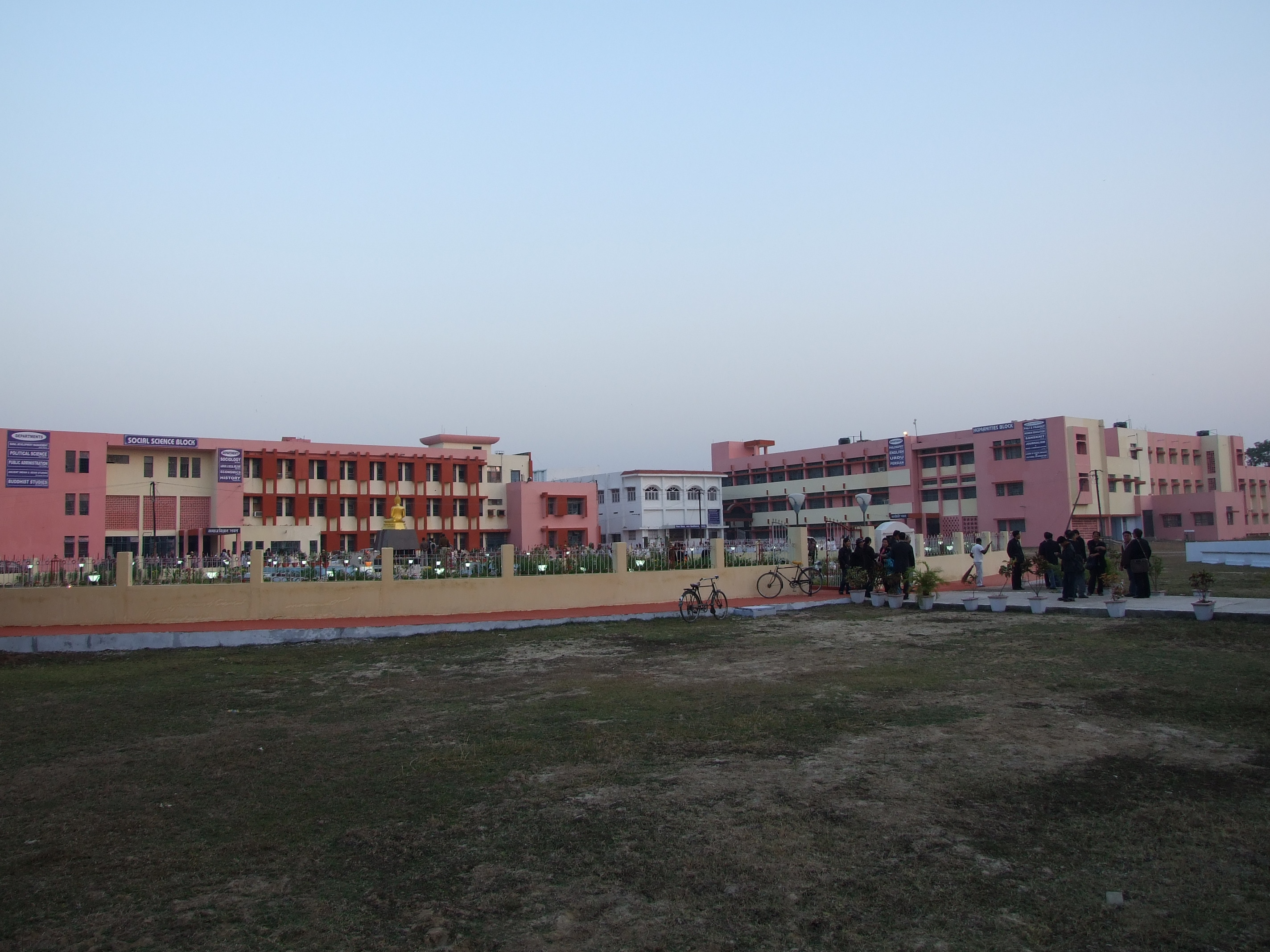
Social Sciences Block of Magadh University

== Colleges ==
Its jurisdiction extends over five districts: Arwal, Aurangabad, Gaya, Jehanabad, and Nawadah.

=== Constituent Colleges ===
- Gaya College, Gaya
- Anugrah Memorial Law college, Gaya
- Sachchidananda Sinha College, Aurangabad
- Gautam Buddha Mahila College, Gaya
- S.N. Sinha College, Jehanabad, Jehanabad
- RLSY College Aurangabad, Aurangabad
- A.N.S College, Nabinagar, Aurangabad
- Daudnagar College, Daudnagar, Aurangabad
- Fatehpur Sanda College, Fatehpur Sanda, Arwal
- Jagjiwan College, Gaya
- K.L.S. College, Nawada
- S.M.S.G. College, Sherghati, Gaya
- S.N.S. College, Tekari, Gaya
- S.N.S College, Warisaliganj, Nawada

=== Affiliated Colleges ===
The university has affiliated colleges across several districts of Bihar.

- B.N.S. College, Sobh, Barachatti, Gaya
- S.P.Y. College, Gaya
- M.S.Y. College, Gaya
- Mahabodhi College, Belaganj, Gaya
- Mahavir College, Gaya
- R. L. S. Y. College, Gaya
- S. D. College, Paraiya, Gaya
- S. M. College, Bodhgaya
- Wazirganj College, Wazirganj, Gaya
- B. B. M. College, Okri, Jehanabad
- Sri Krishna Mahila College, Jehanabad
- Anugrah Smarak College, Jehanabad
- Jehanabad College, Jehanabad
- R. L. S. Y. College, Jehanabad
- Fatehpur Sanda College, Arwal
- R.C.S. College, Kurtha, Arwal
- Shaheed Jagdev Smarak College, Kurtha
- Krishak College, Dewdha, Pakribarwan
- Mahila College, Warisaliganj, Nawada
- S. K. M. College, Nawada
- S.R.S. College, Nawada
- K.S.Y. College, Barun, Aurangabad
- Maharana Pratap College, Dev, Aurangabad
- Mahila College, Daudnagar, Aurangabad
- Thakur B. D. Sinha Jangta College, Goh
- Dr. Vijay Kumar Singh College, Rafiganj
- Mahila College, Tekari
- Laloo Mandal College, Gaya
- Maa Bageshwari College, Gaya
- Sanjay Singh Yadav College, Gaya
- Kamta Prasad Singh College, Gaya
- Kamta Prasad Sharma College, Hulasganj
- Ravi Kant Poonam College, Nawada
- Saptrishi College, Nawada
- Nadariganj College, Nadariganj
- Janta College, Labhari, Aurangabad
- Laldhari Memorial College, Gaya
- Ram Lakhan Singh Yadav College, Jehanabad
- Maa Kamla Chandrika Jee Vidyapeeth, Hulasganj, Jehanabad
- Jang Bahadur Singh Memorial College
- Ramrati Sundarshila College, Aurangabad
- Adhikari College, Silar, Aurangabad
- Prof. Vijay Shankar Rai Mahila College, Sherghati, Gaya
- Dr. Zakir Hussain Evening College, Sherghati, Gaya
- Sanjay Singh Yadav College, Rafiganj, Aurangabad
- C.S. Janta College, Chakand, Gaya
- Lila Mandal College of A.H. Education, Tankuppa, Gaya
- S.A. College, Nawada
- Guro Binda College, Nawada
- Sanjay Gandhi Mahila College, Bairagi, Gaya
- Lalan Prasad Yadav College
- Bhuneshwar Prasad Yadav College, Gaya
- Maa Kamla Chandrika Babu Mahila Mahavidyalaya, Jehanabad
- Gautam Buddha College, Belaganj, Gaya
- Rajdeo Ramchandra College, Banahi Fhesar, Aurangabad
- Dr. Ram Narayan Prasad College, Arwal
- Ramsharan Yadav College, Deokund, Aurangabad
- Suresh Radhika College, Maya Bigha, Kadirganj, Nawada
- Laxmi Narayan College, Tankuppa, Gaya
- S.M.P. College, Fatehpur, Gaya
- Kesho Mahto Memorial College, Pathra, Imamganj, Gaya
- Anugraha Narayan Sinha Memorial College, Aurangabad

== Notable alumni ==
- Khan Sir, teacher
- Surendra Prasad Yadav, politician
- Pankaj Tripathi, actor
- Giriraj Singh politician
- Akhtarul Iman, politician
- Jitan Ram Manjhi, politician
- Mangal Pandey, politician
- Rajiv Pratap Rudy politician
- Prem Kumar, politician
- Satish Kumar Yadav, politician
- Binod Kumar Roy, politician
- Gopal Prasad, Indian-American mathematician
- Ram Kripal Yadav, politician
- Pankaj Kumar Singh, politician
- Khagen Murmu, politician
