= Intermediate of Arts =

High school or junior college academic diploma

Intermediate Arts (IA) is an academic diploma awarded by a high school or junior college after the completion of 12th grade or equivalent in some countries like India and Nepal. However, as for Nepal, the usage of IA, ISc, and the like has become obsolete.

The University of London has functioned as a world-wide examining body on many levels for more than a century. It used to be the degree-awarding body for many colleges throughout the Commonwealth, which have since become independent universities in their own right, and served as a model for others. At the beginning, in 1837, London degrees such as Bachelor of Arts, were awarded after a single degree examination at least two years after passing the Matriculation (entry) examination, but in 1859 the Intermediate Examination in Arts was introduced making it a three-stage process. When the Bachelor of Science degree was introduced in 1867 it came with a similar Intermediate Examination in Science, and an Intermediate Examination in Law was added in 1867. It was not customary to put IA or ISc after one's name as would be done for BA or BSc.

Some Indian universities changed the IA or ISc to First Examination in Arts (or Science, or Law) which could be abbreviated to FA, FSc or FL. The unkind would lampoon those who put one of these after their name as "failed BA" or "failed law" etc.

In England the University of London's Matriculation Examination functioned as a school-leaving examination in the local area before the School Certificate and Higher School Certificate were set up on a national basis. Rather than proceeding straight to university, it was possible to stay on at school and take the IA or ISc examinations a year later while still in the sixth form, thus shortening the time needed at university.
