= Bachelor of Computer Applications =

Undergraduate' degree in computer science, software development, and information technology

A Bachelor of Computer Applications (BCA) is an undergraduate' degree in computer science, software development, and information technology, awarded mainly in India & Nepal. The programme emphasises the practical use of computing, including programming, database systems and web development.

== Duration and eligibility ==
In India, the BCA is traditionally a three-year programme divided into six semesters. Admission generally requires completion of higher-secondary education (10+2) from a recognised board. Eligibility conditions differ between institutions; some require mathematics at the higher-secondary level, while others do not. Admission is based on merit at many institutions, while others use entrance examinations such as the Common University Entrance Test (CUET). Following the National Education Policy 2020, some universities offer a four-year honours version of the degree. Christ University, Chandigarh University, Indira Gandhi National Open University, Lovely Professional University, Jain University, and others offer the BCA programme.

In 'Nepal, the BCA is a four-year programme, offered by Tribhuvan University and colleges affiliated with it.

== Curriculum ==
Curriculum is set by the awarding university and varies between the institutions. Typical subjects include programming languages, data structures and algorithms, database management, operating systems, computer networks, software engineering, web development, mathematics and statistics.

== Progressions and careers ==
BCA graduates commonly pursue the Master of Computer Applications, a postgraduate degree that typically lasts two years, or other postgraduate studies like - MBA, MSc in computer science. Career prospects include - Software developer, web developer, system analyst, database administrator.

== Regulation ==
In India, BCA is regulated by the All India Council for Technical Education (AICTE) and the (University Grants Commission (UGC).

== See also ==
- Bachelor of Computing
- Bachelor of Science in Information Technology
- Bachelor of Technology
