= Senior secondary education =

Education for children about 15 to 18

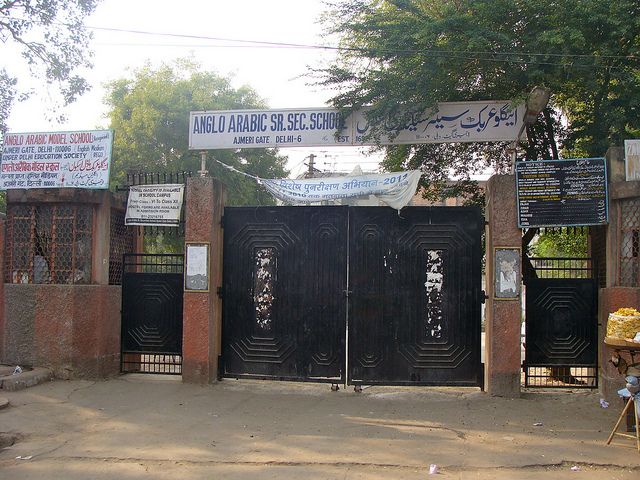
Gate of a senior secondary school in Delhi, India.

The senior secondary years are the years of later adolescence corresponding to the later part of secondary education. Although definitions vary, the senior secondary years are sometimes defined as being from approximately age 15 to age 18. The term generally includes tenth grade, eleventh grade and twelfth grade.

The senior secondary years often involve a difficult transition from the world of the child to that of the adult. In many countries, school attendance is no longer compulsory in the senior secondary years.

The term "senior secondary" may also be used to refer to any institution that covers the upper part of secondary education, such as the High School in all National and State Boards in India and also as the Junior College in some State Boards in India.

== Australia ==
In Australian education, the senior secondary years are the last three years of secondary education, years 10, 11 and 12. The Senior Secondary Certificate of Education (SSCE) is the graduation certificate awarded to most students in Australian high schools. The name and the curriculum of the certificate varies between each state and territory. Some institutions have also traditionally included year 10. Under the Australian Curriculum implemented in the early 2010s, the senior secondary years have a separate curriculum from the curriculum that runs from through year 10.

== See also ==
- Secondary education
- High school
- Early entrance to college
- Four-year junior college
