= Shah Akbar Danapuri =

Indian Islamic scholar, writer and Sufi poet (1844–1914)

Hazrat Shah Akbar Danapuri Naqshbandi Abulolai
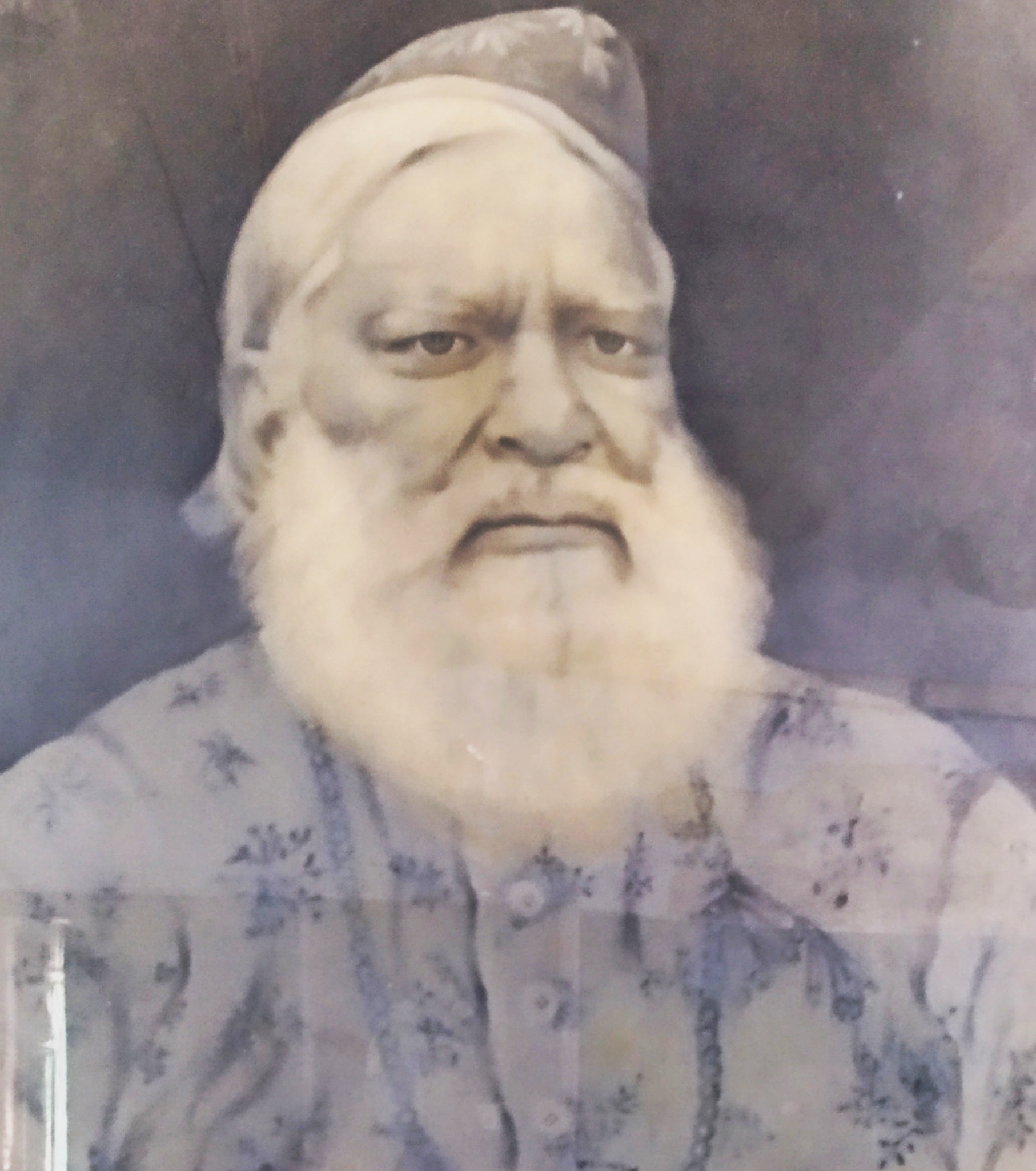

Sajjadanasheen of Khanqah Sajjadiya-Abulolaiya
- Succeeded by: Shah Mohsin Danapuri
- Official name: Shah Muhammad Akbar Abulolai Danapuri

Personal life
- Born: 1844 Agra
- Died: 1914 (aged 69–70) Danapur, Bihar
- Resting place: Khanqah Sajjadiya Abulolaiya, Danapur, Patna district
- Children: Shah Mohsin Danapuri
- Parent: Makhdoom Sajjad Pak (father)
- Era: Modern era
- Region: Bihar
- Main interest: Sufism

Religious life
- Religion: Islam
- Denomination: Sunni
- Lineage: Hashmi
- Jurisprudence: Hanafi
- Tariqa: Naqshbandi Abulolaiya
- Creed: Maturidi

Muslim leader
- Teacher: Maulana Shah Muhammad Qasim Abulolai Danapuri; Waheed Allahabadi; Makhdoom Sajjad Pak
- Influenced by: Abu Hanifa Abdul Qadir Jilani Mu'in al-Din Chishti Nizamuddin Auliya Al-Suyuti Ibn Abidin Qadi Iyad Makhdoom Yahya Maneri Sharfuddin Yahya Maneri Munim Pak

Shah Akbar Danapuri (1844–1914) also known as Shah Muhammad Akbar Abulolai Danapuri (Note: His full name is Shah Muhammad Akbar Abulolai Danapuri) was an Indian Islamic scholar, preacher, writer, linguist and Sufi poet. He belonged to the Naqshbandi Abulolaiya order of Sufism. He was contemporary of Imam Ahmed Raza Khan Barelvi and Waris Ali Shah.

He had served as the Sajjadanasheen of Khanqah Sajjadiya-Abulolaiya from 1884 to 1914. He was a student of Waheed Allahabadi, a disciple of Khwaja Haidar Ali Atish. He was the teacher of Zohra Bai.

== Early life and education ==
Danapuri was born to Shah Sajjad Pak Danapuri on 11 September 1843 at Nai Basti, Agra district of Uttar Pradesh.

He started his studies under the tutelage of his uncle, Maulana Shah Muhammad Qasim Abulolai Danapuri.

== Lineage ==
He belonged to the lineage of Al-Zubayr ibn Abd al-Muttalib, an uncle of Prophet Muhammad. Through his ancestors, he descended from Imam Muhammad Taj Faqih Hashmi, a revered Sufi saint who is believed to have conquered Maner in 1180. Imam Muhammad Taj Faqih Hashmi's legacy continued through his youngest son, Shaikh Abdul Aziz, and his grandson, Sulaiman Langar Zameen, who was married to Makhdooma Bibi Kamal bint Shahabuddin Pir Jagjot of Kako. His paternal ancestors include Makhdoom Ahmad Chishti, Makhdoom Akhwand Sheikh Chishti, Shah Saifullah Chishti Morvi, Shah Aminullah Chishti Shaheed and Shah Taiyabullah Chishti Morvi. While his maternal ancestors include Syed Hasan Zanjani Mashhadi.

=== Role of the family in Independence activism ===
Shah Akbar Danapuri’s uncle, Maulana Shah Muhammad Qasim Danapuri (1803–1864), was an important figure in the events surrounding the Indian Rebellion of 1857. Known for his opposition to British rule, he was actively involved in mobilising local youth and is said to have trained them in military tactics within the Agra Fort. During this period, he met Maulana Ahmadullah Shah Madrasi, a prominent leader of the uprising, and discussed plans to resist colonial authority. Following his involvement in these activities, Shah Qasim Danapuri was arrested by British authorities and sentenced to six months of imprisonment in Moradabad. However, he was later acquitted.

== Career ==
He became the Sajjada nashin of Khanqah Sajjadiya Abulolaiya, Shah Toli, Danapur in 1884, after the death of his father Shah Sajjad Pak Danapuri.

== Personal life ==
In 1865, Danapuri married Bibi Naeema alias Ahmadi Bibi, daughter of Maulana Shah Wilayat Hussain Azimabadi. They had two daughters and one son, Shah Mohsin Danapuri.

== Literary works ==
- Danapuri, Shah Akbar (1867). Kitab-e-Mubarak Tareekh-e-Arab (in Urdu). Agra: Matba Kayast Hitkari.
- Danapuri, Shah Akbar (1875). Maulud-e-Ghareeb (in Urdu). Agra: Abulolai Press.
- Danapuri, Shah Akbar (1889). Maulad-e-Fatimi (in Urdu). Agra: Abulolai Press.
- Danapuri, Shah Akbar (1891). Idrak (in Urdu). Agra: Matba Shaukat Shahjahani.
- Danapuri, Shah Akbar (1893). Iradah (in Urdu). Agra: Matba Dabdaba Hyderi.
- Danapuri, Shah Akbar (1893). Sair-e-Dilli (in Urdu). Agra: Matba Riyaz-e-Hind.
- Danapuri, Shah Akbar (1896). Tajjaliyat-e-Ishq (in Urdu). Agra: Matba Shaukat Shahjahani.
- Danapuri, Shah Akbar (1898). Deewan-e-Akbar (in Urdu). Agra: Matba Shaukat Shahjahani.
- Danapuri, Shah Akbar (1907). Ashraf-ut-Tawareekh (in Urdu). Agra: Agra Akhbar Press.
- Danapuri, Shah Akbar (1915). Jazbat-e-Akbar (in Urdu).
- Danapuri, Shah Akbar (1966). Kalam-e-Akbar Danapuri (in Urdu). Patna: The Art Press.
- Danapuri, Shah Akbar (2023). Abulolai, Raiyan (ed.). Aal-o-Ashab (in Urdu). Danapur: Khanqah Sajjadia Abulolaiya.
- Danapuri, Shah Akbar. Khuda Ki Qudrat (in Urdu).
- Danapuri, Shah Akbar. Risala-e-Ghareeb Nawaz (in Urdu).
- Danapuri, Shah Akbar. Bagh-e-Khayal-e-Akbar (in Urdu). Aagra: Abulolai Press.
- Danapuri, Shah Akbar. Ruhani Guldasta (in Urdu). Danapur: Khanqah Sajjadia Abulolaiya.
- Danapuri, Shah Akbar. Surma-e-Binai (in Urdu). Allahabad: Matba Sleemi Barqi.
- Danapuri, Shah Akbar. Najat-e-Qasim Aur Nazr-e-Mahboob (in Urdu). Agra: Agra Akhbar Press.
- Danapuri, Shah Akbar (2022). Mishra, Suman (ed.). Ashiqon Paanw Na Ukhre (in Hindi). Delhi: Rekhta Publications. ISBN 9789394494107.

== Death and legacy ==
Shah Akbar Danapuri died at the age of 67 on 14 Rajab 1327 AH, corresponding to 1 August 1909, at Khanqah Sajjadiya Abulolaiya, Shah Toli, Danapur, and was buried in the Astana Makhdoom Sajjad Pak on the same night. An annual urs of Shah Akbar Danapuri is celebrated on 14–15 Rajab of the Islamic calendar.

Imam Ahmed Raza Khan Barelvi, founder of the Barelvi movement have mentioned Danapuri in his Qaseeda Amaal-ul-Abrar fi Lam-ul-Ashrar, which was written for people who were against Nadwa movement.

== See also ==
- Ameer Abulola

== Notes ==
=== Bibliography ===
- Abulolai, Shah Mahfoozullah (2017). Halaat-e-Hazrat Shah Akbar Danapuri (in Urdu). Danapur: Khanqah Sajjadia Abulolaiya.
- Barq, Talha Rizvi (1985). Shah Akbar Danapuri: Hayat Aur Shayri (in Urdu).
- Kumar, Dr. Vijay (2012). Urdu Sahitya Ke Vikas Mein Bihari Vibhutiyon Ka Yogdan (in Hindi). Patna: Bihar Rajya Abhilekhagar Nideshalaya. pp. 90–94.
- Kakwi, Ata. Shah Akbar Danapuri (in Urdu).
