= Abu Tawwama =

Islamic scholar, author, muhaddith

Sharaf ad-Dīn Abū Tawʾamah
- شرف ٱلدِّيْن أبُو تَوْأَمَة

Personal life
- Born: Bukhara
- Died: 1300 CE Sonargaon
- Resting place: Dargabari, Sadipur, Mograpara, Narayanganj District
- Children: 1 daughter
- Education: Khorasan
- Other name: Sharf al-Din

Religious life
- Religion: Islam
- Denomination: Sunni
- School: Hanafi

Muslim leader
- Students: Makhdoom Sharfuddin Ahmed Yahya Maneri

Sharaf ad-Dīn Abū Tawʾamah (Arabic: شرف ٱلدِّيْن أبُو تَوْأَمَة, Bengali: আবু তাওয়ামা) was an Islamic scholar, author and muhaddith based in the subcontinent. He played a large role in disseminating Islam in eastern Bengal, establishing one of the country's first madrasas. According to A. F. M. Abdur Rahman, in addition to his proficiency in Persian and Arabic, he became well conversant in the local Old Bengali language of the time.

== Life ==
Abu Tawwama was born into a Sunni Muslim family from Bukhara in modern-day Uzbekistan, a city located on the Silk Road famed as a centre of scholarship. His brother was Hafiz Zayn ad-Din who he later migrated with across Greater Khorasan to study Islamic theology and the natural sciences. He is said to have married at the age of 45 and had a daughter in Bukhara. After completing his education to a good level, he decided to move to Delhi in circa 1260, where he taught for 10 years with the permission of Sultan Ghiyas ud din Balban.

In circa 1270, Abu Tawwama and his family were requested by the Sultan to move to the city of Sonargaon in Bengal, where Islam was not properly settled among the populace. Others have theorised that the reason for moving was because the Sultan of Delhi feared that the scholar's influence was becoming a threat to his dominion and so exiled Abu Tawwama to Sonargaon.

Abu Tawwama, Zaynuddin and their family then set off for Bengal, passing through Maner Sharif in Bihar where they stayed for 4 years serving alongside Yahya Maneri. Maneri's son, Ahmed Maneri, became a disciple of Abu Tawwama and joined him on the journey to Sonargaon. Having finally reached Sonargaon, Abu Tawwama established a seminary and a madrasa in the city; turning Sonargaon into a notable centre of Islamic education in the subcontinent. Ahmed Maneri studied here for 22 years as his disciple, and Abu Tawwama later gave his daughter's hand in marriage to him. They had a son called Zaki Maneri.

Abu Tawwama wrote a book on spirituality called "Maqāmat". The Persian book on Islamic jurisprudence titled Nām-i-Haq is attributed to either Abu Tawwama or one of his disciples.

== Death and legacy ==
Tawwama died in 1300 and was buried in a small tomb located in Mograpara, Sonargaon. The madrassah no longer exists though its ruins can be found in the Dargabari area.
