= Mohaddipur =

Coordinates: 27°14′N 79°55′E

Mohaddipur is a small village approximately 25 km from Bihar Sharif town in the Indian state of Bihar. The village has a population of approximately 2,000 as per the 2011 India census.
