= Odantapuri =

Buddhist Mahavihara

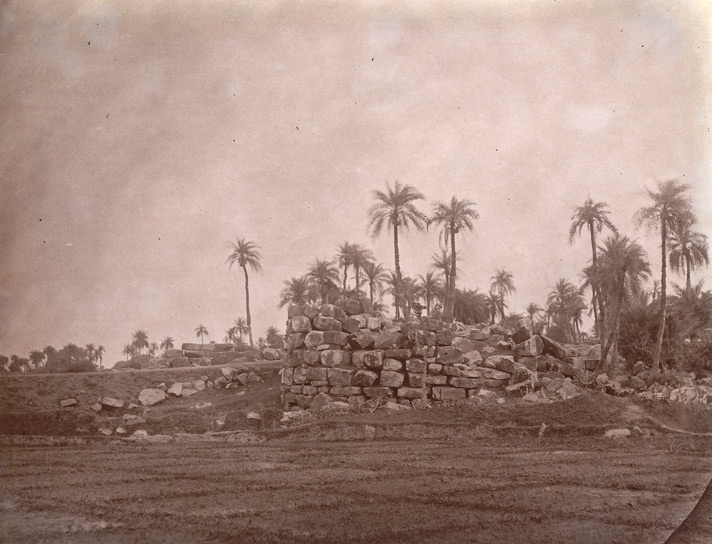
- Photograph of the old ruined gate of the fort at Bihar Sharif in Bihar, taken by Joseph David Beglar in the 1870s. The fort is believed to have been part of Odantapuri

- Location within India Location within Bihar
- 25.197°N 85.518°E
- Type: Centre of learning
- Location: Bihar, India

History
- Built: 8th–9th century CE
- Abandoned: 13th century CE
- Event: Destroyed by Muhammad bin Bakhtiyar Khalji in the late 12th-century

Odantapuri (also called Odantapura or Uddandapura) was a prominent Buddhist monastic university in what is now Bihar Sharif in Bihar, India. It is believed to have been established by the Pala ruler Gopala I in the 8th century. It is considered the second oldest of India's Mahaviharas after Nalanda and was situated in Magadha. Inscriptional evidence also indicates that the Mahavihara was supported by local Buddhist kings like the Pithipatis of Magadha.

The vihara fell into decline in the 11th century, and was looted and destroyed by Muhammad bin Bakhtiyar Khalji, a Turkic Muslim invader in the late 1100s, when he launched multiple raids on Bihar and adjoining territories.

== Location ==
Joseph David Beglar first identified the city of Bihar (Bihar Sharif) with Odantapuri; as the city used to be called Bihar Dandi or Dand Bihar, which is a contraction of Dandpur Bihar (derived from "Dandpura Vihara").

A small brass image of Buddha's birth mother Mahamaya, bearing a votive inscription on the back that mentioned the name Uddandapura, was also discovered in Bihar Sharif. Based on inscriptions along with local tradition and literary evidence, it is believed that the modern town of Bihar Sharif is built on the ancient site of Odantapuri.

About the location of Odantapuri, S.C.Das, depending on the account by Sumpa Khan-po (18th century Tibetan polymath), thought that it was “erected on a hill near the town of modern Behar.” However, dge-’dun-chos-’phel stated: “On the railway line from Patna to Rajgir, there is a station called Bihar-Sharif. If one looks to the west after reaching the station, one will see a low mound." This is said to contain the ruins of Odantapuri Vihara.

This is likely a reference to the locality of Gadh Par in Bihar Sharif which is a huge mound itself. A number of sculptures of the Pala period and some partial brick structures have occasionally been reported from this mound.

The area around Gadh Par (or Garhpar) used to have the remains of an ancient fort (Note: gaṛh means 'fort' in Hindi (inherited from Ashokan Prakrit) - Wiktionary, 'गढ़') surrounded by a wide moat, which was visible till the time Buchanan Hamilton visited it in 1812. According to Hamilton, it was built by a Maga Raja (king of Magadha), and was destroyed by Muhammedans in the 12th century. The fort is believed to have been part of the Odantapuri University.

Over the years, many civil and municipal buildings like the Civil Court and Nalanda College were built over it. By the 1960s, the ruins of the fort had almost totally disappeared as the area was occupied by a portion of the town itself. The original campus of Sardar Patel Memorial College was also built in that area, and both the college and the neighbourhood are still called 'Udantpuri' after the name of the ancient university.

However, the location of Odantapuri has not yet been conclusively established.

== History ==
Gopala, the founder of the Pala dynasty, who ascended the throne of Bengal in 750 CE, founded the monastic university at Odantapuri. According to Bu-ston, however, the Odantapuri monastery was built by Gopala's son and successor, Dharmapala; while according to Taranatha, it was founded by either Gopala or Devapala.

Odantapuri was part of a network of five Mahaviharas in eastern India. The others were Nalanda, Vikramashila, Somapura, and Jagaddala. During the Pala period, Vikramshila was the leading monastery, and the state funding to Vikramshila and Odantapuri far exceeded what was granted to Nalanda. As a result, while Nalanda was struggling for survival around the 11th century CE, Odantapuri had a rival institution thriving under the royal patronage of the Palas.

Taranatha mentions a king called Mahāpāla, who he claims was Mahipala's son, who mainly honoured the Srāvakas of Odantapuri, maintaining five hundred monks and fifty teachers. As an annexe to Odantapuri, he built a vihara called Uruvasa, to provide livelihood and accommodation to five hundred "Srāvaka Sendhapas" (Srāvaka Saindhavas or Singhala Srāvakas, who were Sthaviravadins). While he allowed Vikramashila to retain its position, he made Uruvasa a centre of great veneration.

According to Taranatha, during the reign of Ramapala, along with fifty teachers in Odantapuri, "permanently lived a thousand monks belonging to both Hinayana and Mahayana. Occasionally even twelve thousand monks congregated there."

The temple library of the Odantapuri vihara was loftier than those at Vajrasana (Bodh Gaya) and Nalanda and contained a vast collection of Brahmanical and Buddhist works. It was burnt under the orders of one of the generals of Muhammad bin Bakhtiyar Khalji, when Khalji's army sacked the monastery around the end of the 12th century CE. The monks who survived the massacre fled to Nepal and Tibet.

== Legends ==
Various legends are associated with the establishment of Odantapuri:

=== The tirthika and the corpse ===
According to Taranatha and Sumpa, Odantapuri was built using the gold that was miraculously obtained in a mystical process.

A tirthika yogi (tantrika) called Narada, who had miraculous powers, sought a strong, brave, and truthful companion versed in all crafts and branches of knowledge, to assist him in a ritual with a corpse (shava sadhana). He couldn't find anyone who met the criteria except a Buddhist upasaka. The upaska initially refused to be the assistant to a tirthika, but Narada convinced him by promising him wealth which could be used by the upasaka to spread his religion.

They performed the ritual and as it was reaching fulfilment, Narada said that when the corpse sticks its tongue out, the upasaka must catch it. He told him that if he catches it in the first try, he will attain supreme success (maha-siddhi), if he does it in the second try, he will gain intermediate success, and if he catches it in the third try, he will get small success. However, if he failed to catch it even after the third time, the vetala (corpse) will devour them both and then empty the whole world. After failing to catch the tongue twice, the upasaka sat with his own mouth near the corpse's, and caught its tongue with his teeth. Then the tongue became a sword, and the corpse turned into gold. When the upasaka held the sword he began to fly in the sky. He flew to the top of Sumeru and circled it along with the four dvipas and their upa-dvipas. When he returned he gave the sword to Narada, who let him have the gold but warned him not to spend it for immoral purposes.

Narada then flew to heaven, and the upasaka who came to be known as Unna Upasaka built the colossal temple of Odantapuri using the gold. The craftsmen and artists who worked on the building were paid with that gold, and it was also used for maintenance of 500 bhikshus and 500 upasakas. The gold couldn't be used by anyone after Unna's death, so before he died he buried it under the earth praying that it might benefit all living beings in future. Then he handed over the Odantapuri vihara to king Devapala.

Sumpa Khan-po mentioned that Otanta in Otantapuri (Odantapuri) meant "soaring on high". This might be derived from the Sanskrit uddayana, uddyanta meaning "going up or flying". According to the legend, the temple was called so because Unna had flown over Sumeru and seen the mountain along with its four dvipas, and hence built Odantapuri in its model.

=== Dharmapala and the serpent ===
In History of Buddhism in India and Tibet, Bu-ston recounts the story of Dharmapala's birth and how he built the monastery at Odantapuri.

Gopala's queen Dedda Devi, who was the daughter of a king of the Bhadra dynasty, had no power over Gopala; and hence asked a Brahmin for some magical power so that she could bring him under her influence. The Brahmin brought an enchanted drug from the Himalayas and gave it to the queen's maidservant. While crossing a bridge, the maidservant fell down and the drug was carried away by the stream to the ocean. It was seized and swallowed by the king of the Nagas, who was the sovereign of the ocean. By the power of the drug, he became subjected to power of the queen, and united with her. From their union, a son named Dharmapala was born.

At an auspicious hour when religious ceremonies for the child were being performed, the head of a serpent haughtily rose up, which caused the king to get enraged. He resolved to cut it off, but a ring was shown to him, on which he beheld the characters of the Nagas. He then continued to worship, and devoted himself to the child's education.

When Dharmapala grew up, he was possessed with a desire to build a temple more magnificent than others and enquired soothsayers on this matter. They said that it was necessary to make a wick out of cotton belonging to ascetics and Brahmins, get oil from houses of kings and merchants, obtain an oil-burner from a place of penance, and burn a lamp using those and place it before the tutelary deity. If the king addressed an entreaty, the serpent of Dharmapala would throw the lamp away, and the temple must be built where the lamp falls.

The lamp was lit, but suddenly a raven appeared and threw the lamp into a lake. Dharmapala was distressed, but that night the king of the Nagas came to him and said — "I am thy father, and I will cause this lake to dry up. Thou shalt build thy temple in the place of it. (In order to bring this about) thou must perform sacrifices for seven weeks." This was accordingly done. On the 21st day the lake was dried up, and in its place the temple of Odantapuri was built.

== Influences ==
Tibetan sources indicate that the 8th century Samye monastery, which was the first Buddhist monastery in Tibet, was modelled upon Odantapuri (which in turn was modelled after Sumeru and the four dvipas).

== Destruction ==
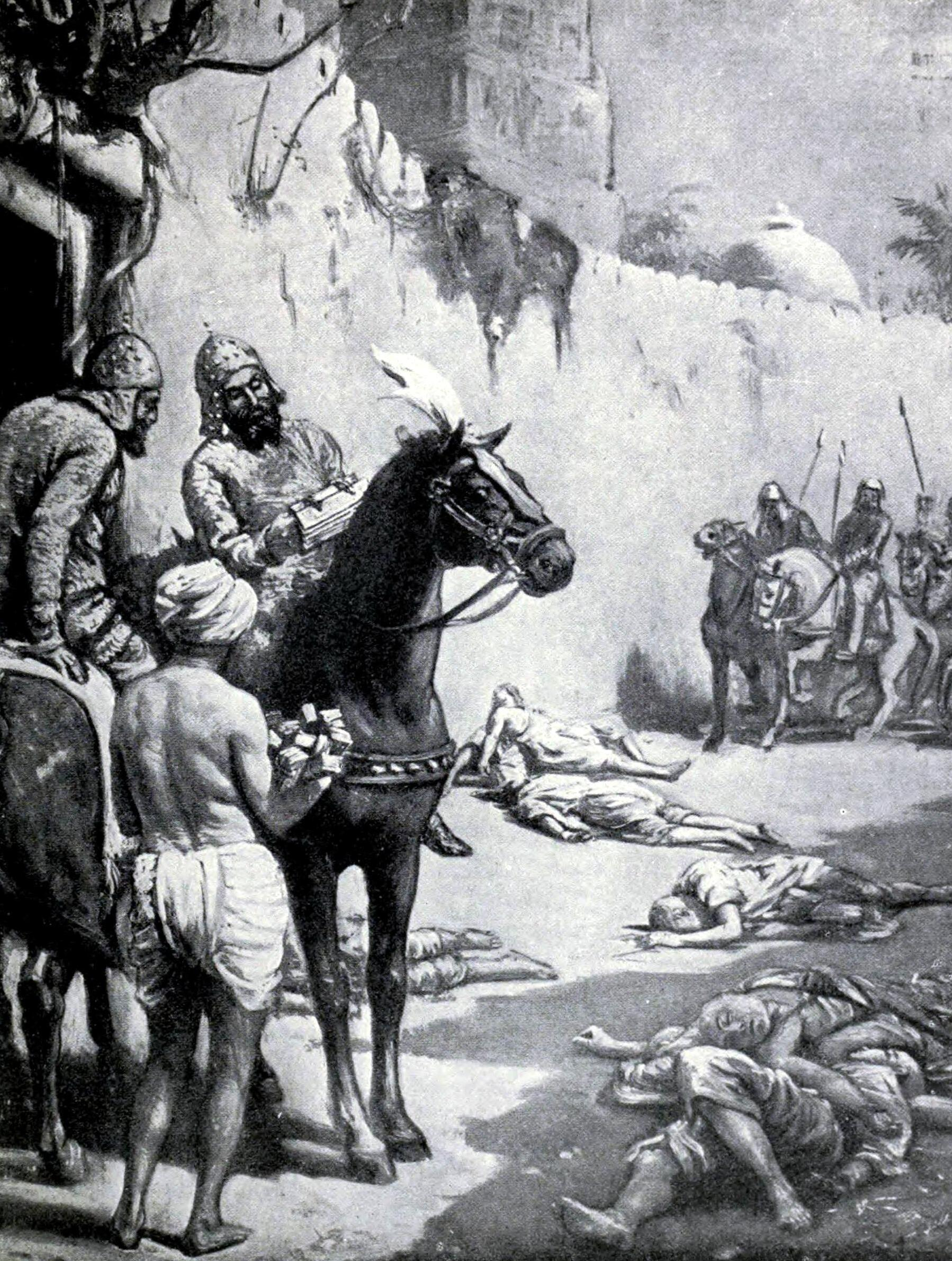
The image, in the chapter on India in Hutchison's Story of the Nations edited by James Meston, depicts the Muslim Turkic general Bakhtiyar Khalji's massacre of Buddhist monks in Bihar, India. Khaliji's troops destroyed the Nalanda, Vikramashila, and Odantapuri universities during his raids across North Indian plains, massacring many Buddhist and Brahmin scholars.

In around 1193 CE, Muhammad bin Bakhtiyar Khalji, a Turkic chieftain out to make a name for himself, was in the service of a commander in Awadh. The Persian historian, Minhaj-i-Siraj in his Tabaqat-i Nasiri, recorded his deeds a few decades later. Khalji was assigned two villages on the border of Bihar which had become a political no-man's land. Sensing an opportunity, he began a series of plundering raids into Bihar and was recognised and rewarded for his efforts by his superiors. Emboldened, Khalji decided to attack a fort in Bihar and was able to successfully capture it, looting it with a great booty. The fort was destroyed with all of its inhabitants slaughtered and the library burnt. He later came to know that the fort was a vihara.

Minhaj-i-Siraj wrote of this attack:

Muhammad-i-Bakht-yar, by the force of his intrepidity, threw himself into the postern of the gateway of the place, and they captured the fortress and acquired great booty. The greater number of the inhabitants of that place were Brahmans, and the whole of those Brahmans had their heads shaven, and they were all slain. There were a great number of books there; and, when all these books came under the observation of the Musalmans, they summoned a number of Hindus that they might give them information respecting the import of those books; but the whole of the Hindus had been killed. On becoming acquainted [with the contents of those books], it was found that the whole of that fortress and city was a college, and in the Hindui tongue, they call a college [مدرسه] Bihar.

This passage refers to an attack on a Buddhist monastery (the "Bihar" or Vihara) and its monks (the shaved Brahmans). The exact date of this event is not known, with scholarly estimates ranging from 1197 to 1206.

While many historians believe that this monastery which was mistaken for a fort was Odantapura, some are of the opinion that it was Nalanda instead; even though the Tabaqat-i-Nasiri mentions "Adwand Bihar" among the conquests of Khalji, which is obviously a corruption of the name "Uddandapura vihara". However, considering that the two Mahaviharas were only a few kilometres apart, both very likely befell a similar fate.

Taranatha writes that the emperor of Magadha had fortified the monastery and stationed some soldiers with whom the monks joined in repulsing the invaders. He mentions that one of the early raids on Odantapuri was repulsed and the Turushka force of five hundreds was defeated. According to the biography of Dharmasvamin, who journeyed to India between 1234 and 1236, Odantapuri was turned into a military headquarters of the Turkic forces after its destruction.

== Notable scholars ==
- Abhayakaragupta
- Atisa
- Ratnakarasanti

== Bibliography ==
- Chandra, Satish (2004). Volume 1 of Medieval India: From Sultanat to the Mughals. Har-Anand Publications. ISBN 978-8124110645.
- Ghosh, Amalananda (1965). A Guide to Nalanda (5 ed.). New Delhi: The Archaeological Survey of India.
- Minhaj-ud-Din, Maulana (1881). Tabakat-i-Nasiri – A General History of the Muhammadan Dynasties of Asia Including Hindustan. Translated by Major H. G. Raverty. p. 552.
