= Bihar Aur Sufivad =

2025 Hindi-language book

- Author: Syed Amjad Hussain
- Language: Hindi
- Subject: History, Sufism, Islam, Bihar
- Genre: History
- Publisher: Rajmangal Prakashan
- Publication date: 27 April 2025
- Publication place: India
- Media type: Print (paperback) and e-book
- Pages: 308
- ISBN: 978-9348578358

Bihar Aur Sufivad is a 2025 historical non-fiction book by Indian author, poet and historian, Syed Amjad Hussain. Published on 27 April 2025 by Rajmangal Prakashan, an imprint of Rajmangal Publishers. The book examines the development and legacy of Sufism in India and particularly the Indian state of Bihar. Drawing upon rare manuscripts, oral traditions, archival sources and inscriptions, the book documents the contributions of key Sufi figures and the role of Sufi institutions in the cultural and spiritual life of the region.

== Overview ==
Bihar Aur Sufivad explores the early roots of Islam in India and Sufism in Bihar, tracing its introduction to the region through figures such as Momin Arif, Imam Muhammad Taj Faqih Hashmi, and Qazi Syed Shahabuddin Suhrawardi Kashgari. The book details the influence of major Sufi orders including the Suhrawardi, Chishti, Qadiri, and Naqshbandi silsilahs and their offshoots, and highlights their integration with the social and spiritual fabric of Bihar over centuries.

Hussain pays special attention to the roles played by Sufi figures such as Shah Muhammad Munim Pak, Syed Ahmed Jajneri, Makhdoom Shah Aamun, and other Suhrawardi, Chishti, and Firdausi Sufis, presenting them as central to the diffusion of Islamic spirituality, education, and inclusive religious practices in Bihar. The book also examines the architectural, literary, and reformist legacies left behind by these Sufi traditions.

There is an article on Sufism in India by Ghulam Rasool Dehlvi and one article on Chishti order of Sufism by Peerzada Syed Firozul Hasan Chishti.

== About author ==
The author Syed Amjad Hussain was a last year student at Maulana Abul Kalam Azad University of Technology when the book was published. Hussain is a descendant of Syed Ahmed Jajneri through his great-grandfather Mir Abdullah Bihari.

Amjad previously wrote Akhtar Orenvi: Bihar Mein Urdu Sahitya Ke Nirmata, a biographical book on Akhtar Orenvi and The Eternals of Bihar, covering 25 unknown and lesser known Muslim figures of Bihar.

== Book launch ==
The book was launched on 29 June 2025 at Bihar Industries Association Auditorium, Patna, Bihar.

== Reviews ==
The book has been reviewed by:

- Souhardya De in the Heritage Times.
- Sahil Razvi in the The Muslim Mirror.
- Afroz Khan in Countercurrents.
- Shahjad Mia on MunsifTV.
- Ashwin Afraad in the Millat Times.
