= Kita Chauhattar =

Village in Bihar, India

- Village
- Location within Bihar Location within India
- Coordinates: 25°39′56″N 84°52′33″E
- Country: India
- State: Bihar
- District: Patna
- Block: Maner

Government
  - Type: Sarpanch

Area
  - Total: 23.73 km^{2} (9.16 sq mi)
- Elevation: 60 m (200 ft)

Population (2011)
  - Total: 35,608
  - Density: 1,501/km^{2} (3,886/sq mi)

Languages
  - Common: Magahi, Hindi
- Time zone: UTC+5:30 (IST)
- PIN: 801108
- STD code: 06115
- Vehicle registration: BR-01

Kita Chauhattar is a village in Maner Block, Patna District, Bihar, India. It is situated by the district boundary with Bhojpur District, about 27 kilometres west of the district seat Patna, and 2 kilometres north of the block seat Maner. The population of the village was 35,608 in 2011.

== Geography ==
Kita Chauhattar is located on the southern bank of Ganges River. It has an area of 2373 hectares.

== Demographics ==
The 2011 India census reported the number of households in Kita Chauhattar to be 5,231. The gender composition was 52.85% male and 47.15% female. The average literacy rate was 40.47%, with 49.26% of the male population and 30.63% of the female population being literate.
