= L. S. N. Prasad =

Indian pediatrician (1914–2009)

- Born: 1 January 1914; Bihar Sharif, Bihar, India
- Died: 22 April 2009 (aged 95); Patna, Bihar, India
- Resting place: Patna; 25°06′00″N 85°01′00″E
- Other name: Lala Suraj Nandan Prasad
- Occupation: Pediatrician
- Years active: 1939–2009
- Known for: Development of pediatrics in Bihar
- Spouse: Shakuntala Devi
- Children: 8
- Awards: Padma Shri

Lala Suraj Nandan Prasad (1914–2009) was an Indian pediatrician and a former professor of pediatrics of the Patna Medical College and Hospital whose efforts were reportedly behind the establishment of the department of pediatrics and the development of the children's ward into a 250-bed Children's Hospital at the institution. He was the founder president of the Indian Academy of Pediatrics when the organization was formed in 1964 though the merger of the erstwhile Indian Pediatric Society and the Association of Pediatricians of India. The Government of India awarded him the fourth highest Indian civilian award of Padma Shri in 1974.

== Biography ==
Lala Suraj Nandan Prasad was born on the New Year day of 1914 at Bihar Sharif to Babu Ram Prasad Lalwas, a lawyer. He passed his matriculation from Dumka Zilla School in 1933 standing first in Bhagalpur district, winning Mcpherson Gold Medal and passed MBBS from Patna Medical College and Hospital, then Prince of Wales Medical College, in 1939. After his internship for a year at Danapur, Gopalganj, he joined his alma mater in 1940 as a deputy superintendent and worked there till 1945 when he moved to England where he completed a diploma in child health. He continued his stay in UK and secured an MRCP from the Royal College of Physicians of Edinburgh in 1946 after which he worked there till 1947, at institutions such as the Hospital for Sick Children, Royal Infirmary of Edinburgh and the London Hospital.

Prasad returned to India in 1947 and joined Patna Medical College and Hospital in 1948 as a lecturer at the department of medicine and became a professor in 1962. During his tenure there, he started the department of pediatrics and, later, developed the children's ward into a hospital with a capacity of 250 beds. He also served the Rajendra Memorial Research Institute of Medical Sciences, Patna as an honorary director. In the early sixties, Prasad joined with George Coelho and his associate pediatrics to merge the Association of Pediatricians of India and the Indian Pediatric Society under one umbrella with a new identity in 1964 and Prasad was made the founder president of the new organization, the Indian Academy of Pediatrics. He took superannuation from Patna Medical College on 31 December 1971 but continued his activities by associating himself with the various medical committees.

Prasad, who presented over 50 research papers at various medical conferences, was a fellow of the Royal College of Physicians of Edinburgh (1964), American Academy of Pediatrics (1964) and the Indian Academy of Pediatrics (1974). A former vice president of the National Academy of Medical Sciences, Prasad was appointed as the Professor Emeritus of the Patna Medical College and Hospital in 1974. The same year, the Government of India included him the Republic Day honours list for the civilian honour of Padma Shri. He died on 22 April 2009 at his Patna residence at the age of 95, leaving behind five sons and three daughters, his wife Sakuntala Devi preceding him in death. A healthcare centre in his honour has been established in Patna under the name, Dr. Lala Suraj Nandan Prasad Memorial Clinic.
