= Taj Faqih =

Imam Muhammad Taj Faqih
- إمام محمد تاج فقيه

Personal life
- Born: c. 1130 Jerusalem, Kingdom of Jerusalem
- Children: Shaikh Israil, Shaikh Ismail
- Known for: Establishing the first khanqah in Bihar, patriarch of a major Sufi lineage in South Asia
- Relatives: Al-Zubayr ibn Abd al-Muttalib (ancestor); Sharfuddin Yahya Maneri (great-grandson)

Religious life
- Religion: Islam
- Denomination: Sunni

Imam Muhammad Taj Faqih (also known as Tajuddin Faqih or Taj al-Din Faqih) was a 12th-century Islamic scholar, theologian, and Sufi saint who migrated from Jerusalem to the Indian subcontinent. He is historically noted as one of the earliest prominent Sufi figures in Bihar, India, where he established the region's first khanqah (Sufi hospice) and madrasa in Maner Sharif around 1180 AD. He is recognized by academic historians as the patriarch of a highly influential lineage of Sufi saints in South Asia, including his descendant Sharfuddin Yahya Maneri.

== Early life and migration ==
According to traditional and historical accounts, Taj Faqih traced his ancestry to Al-Zubayr ibn Abd al-Muttalib. He served as a theologian in Jerusalem prior to his eastward migration. In the late 12th century, arriving in Bihar around 576 AH (approximately 1180 AD), he settled in Maner, a town of considerable antiquity near modern-day Patna that became one of the earliest centers of Muslim habitation in the region.

== Establishment in Bihar ==
Upon his arrival in Bihar, historical narratives indicate that Taj Faqih and his followers encountered resistance from the local ruler, the Raja of Maner. Following this conflict, the Raja fled, and Taj Faqih established Bihar's first khanqah. This institution created a central hub for the Suhrawardiyya and Firdausiyya Sufi orders.

== Legacy and descendants ==
Taj Faqih's primary historical impact was sustained through his descendants, who profoundly influenced the religious environment of Bengal and Bihar. His sons, including Shaikh Israil and Shaikh Ismail, continued his work and propagation of the Suhrawardi order. His grandson, Yahya Maneri, and his great-grandson, the celebrated Sufi saint Sharfuddin Yahya Maneri, became foundational figures of the Firdausi order in India.

Imam Taj Faqih was officially recognized in the cultural history of Bihar by the state's tourism department as one of the first Sufi saints who initiated early brotherhood and syncretism among the local populations.

== See also ==
- Sufism in India
- Khanqah
- Sharfuddin Yahya Maneri
- Maner Sharif
