= Sardar Patel Memorial College =

Degree college in Bihar

- सरदार पटेल मेमोरियल महाविद्यालय
- Established: 1974; 52 years ago
- Affiliations: Patliputra University
- Location: Udantpuri, Bihar Sharif, Bihar, 803101; 25°11′10″N 85°31′39″E
- Website: spmcudantpuri.ac.in

Sardar Patel Memorial College, also known as S.P.M. College, Udantpuri, is a degree college in Bihar Sharif in the district of Nalanda in Bihar, India. It is a constituent unit of Patliputra University. The college offers undergraduate degree and postgraduate degree in arts, science, and information technology.

== History ==
The college, named after freedom fighter and the first Deputy Prime Minister of India, Sardar Vallabhbhai Patel, was established in 1974.

It was built in the area having the remains of an ancient fort, which is believed to have been part of the Udantpuri University, founded by the king Gopala of Pala Dynasty in 8th century AD. The neighbourhood is still known by the name 'Udantpuri' after the name of the historical university.

It was converted into a constituent unit of Magadh University in 1980. The college has become a constituent unit of Patliputra University since March 2018.

== Degrees and courses ==
The college offers the following degrees and courses.

- Senior Secondary
  - Intermediate of Arts
  - Intermediate of Science
- Bachelor's degree
  - Bachelor of Arts
  - Bachelor of Science
