= Nalanda College, Biharsharif =

College in Bihar, India

Coordinates: 25.2036°N 85.5261°E

Nalanda College
- नालंदा महाविद्यालय
- Type: Undergraduate and Postgraduate College
- Established: 1870
- Affiliations: Patliputra University
- Principal: Prof. Sunita Sinha
- Location: Biharsharif, Nalanda district, Bihar, India
- Campus: 8.7 acre; Urban
- Colors: Green and Red
- Website: https://nalandacollege.ac.in

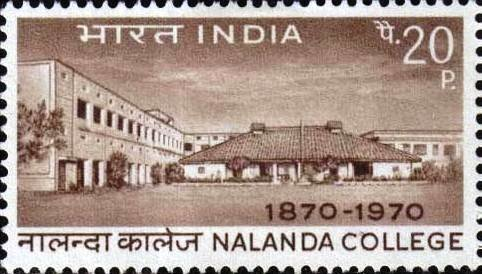
A commemorative postage stamp issued on the centenary of Nalanda College

Nalanda College, Biharsharif is a college in Bihar Sharif, the district headquarters of Nalanda District in Bihar state, India. It is a constituent unit of Patliputra University. It was established in 1870, and is one of the oldest colleges of north India. Its catchment area includes nearby villages and small towns in Bihar Sharif. The Government of India issued stamps with its picture in 1970 to mark its centenary. This college offers undergraduate and postgraduate courses in science, commerce and arts.

== History ==
Bihar Sharif Nalanda College was founded by Canto Singh, a landlord in Bihar. He had granted 8.7 acres of land for the college. To remember his contribution, his statue is standing in the campus. The college was built in the area having the remains of an ancient fort, which is believed to have been a part of Odantapuri university.

The college was initially under the jurisdiction of the University of Calcutta. Later, it came under Bihar University, and finally under Magadh University, Bodhgaya. In 2018, it became a part of PATLIPUTRA UNIVERSITY, PATNA.

D. P. Singh was appointed principal of the college. After his retirement, Dr. S. N. Sinha took the charge as the principal of this college.

== Notable professors ==
- Siddheswar Prasad, Served as MP from Nalanda district and Governor of Tripura

== Notable alumni ==
- Veer Pratap Singh - Indian cricketer
