= Bihar Sharif =

Sub-metropolitan city in Bihar, India

- City
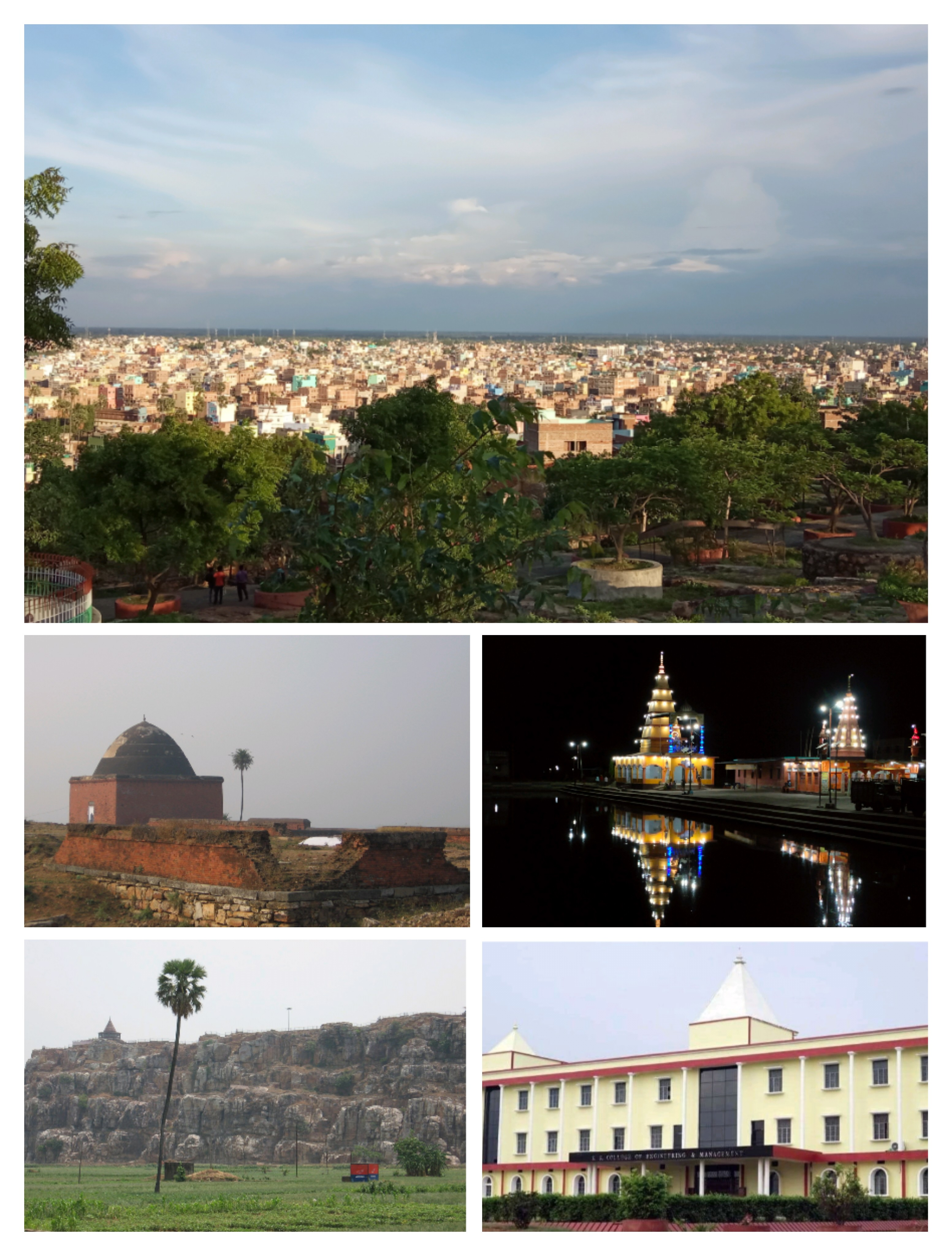
- Top to bottom: The City Skyline, Tomb of Ibrahim Baya, Mora Talab Temple, View of Peer Pahadi from NH 20, An institutional block at K. K. University

- Location within Bihar Location within India
- Coordinates: 25.197°N 85.518°E
- Country: India
- State: Bihar
- Division: Patna
- District: Nalanda

Government
  - Type: Municipal Corporation
  - Body: Bihar Sharif Municipal Corporation
  - Member of Parliament: Kaushalendra Kumar
  - District Magistrate: Kundan Kumar, IAS
  - Superintendent of Police, Nalanda: Bharat Soni, IPS
  - Municipal Commissioner: Deepak Kumar Mishra, IAS
  - Mayor: Aneeta Devi

Area
  - City: 152.94 km^{2} (59.05 sq mi)
  - Urban: 23.5 km^{2} (9.1 sq mi)
  - Regional planning: 78.53 km^{2} (30.32 sq mi)
- Elevation: 55 m (180 ft)

Population (2011)
  - City: 297,268
  - Density: 15,743/km^{2} (40,770/sq mi)

Language
  - Official: Hindi
  - Additional official: Urdu
  - Local: Magahi
- Time zone: UTC+5:30 (IST)
- PIN: 803101 803118 803216 803111 803113
- Telephone code: +916112
- ISO 3166 code: IN-BR
- Vehicle registration: BR-21
- Loksabha Constituency: Nalanda (29)
- Vidhan Sabha Constituency: Bihar Sharif (172)
- Website: nagarseva.bihar.gov.in/biharsharif

Bihar Sharif is the headquarters of Nalanda district and the fifth-largest sub-metropolitan area in the eastern Indian state of Bihar. Its name is a combination of two words: Bihar, derived from vihara (meaning monastery), also the name of the state; and Sharif (meaning noble). The city is a hub of education and trade in southern Bihar, and the economy centers around agriculture supplemented by tourism, the education sector and household manufacturing. The ruins of the ancient Nalanda Mahavihara, a UNESCO World Heritage Site, are located near the city.

Under the Pala Empire, Odantapuri, a major Buddhist monastic university was built at the site of Bihar Sharif. In the early 14th century, the city was captured by the Delhi Sultanate. Bihar Sharif was later ruled by other Muslim dynasties and then by the British until Indian independence in 1947. The city has important Buddhist, Hindu and Muslim heritage sites and landmarks.

Bihar Sharif is one of the one hundred Indian cities selected to gain funds under Prime Minister Narendra Modi's flagship Smart Cities Mission. Bihar Sharif was selected in the preliminary list of 100 cities in July 2015 that were to compete for the Smart Cities project.

According to Ease of Living Index 2020, Bihar Sharif has been ranked as the most livable among cities in Bihar which have population under 1 million. It was ranked 1st in Bihar and 28th among cities with a population under 1 million in India with an overall ranking of 63rd among 111 Indian cities.

== Etymology ==
The city's name is a combination of two words: Bihar, derived from vihara (meaning monastery), also the name of the state; and Sharif (meaning noble), referring to the resting place of the Sufi Saint Sheikh Makhdoom Sharfuddin Ahmed Yahya Maneri.

== History ==
=== Classical and medieval period ===
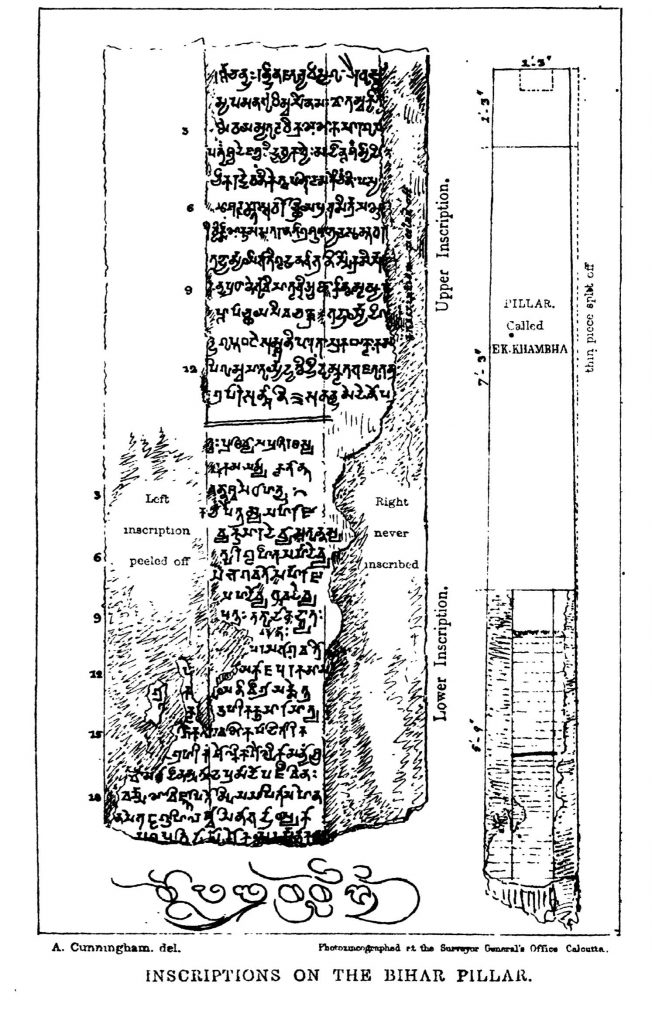
Inscriptions on the Bihar Sharif pillar

A pillar dating to the 5th century from the time of the Gupta Empire was found near the fort of Bihar Sharif. It is 14 ft tall and has two inscriptions inscribed upon it by two Gupta rulers, first of Kumaragupta (413–455 CE) and second of Skandagupta (456–480 CE).

The name Bihar is derived from vihar or vihara, meaning Buddhist monastery, a reference to the ancient Odantapuri University established near the city in the 7th century CE by Pala king Gopala I. The settlement does, however, predate the Buddha. It became the capital of the Magadha kingdom in the Pala Empire.

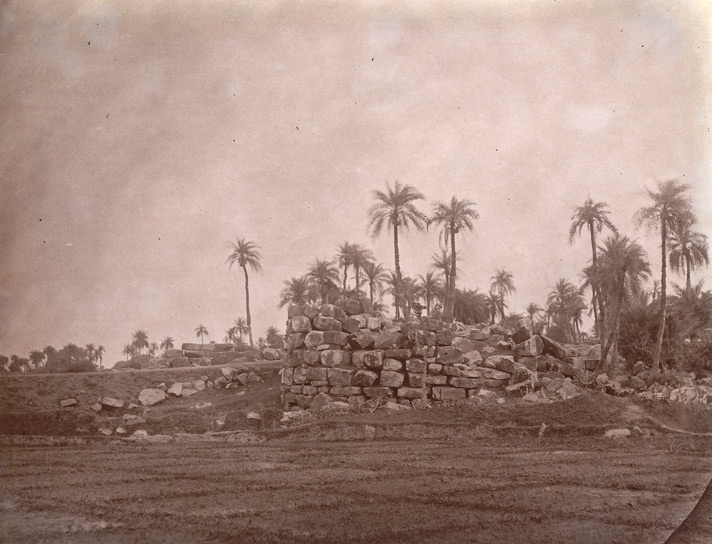
Photograph of the old ruined gate of the fort at Bihar Sharif from 1870s. The fort is believed to have been part of Odantapuri.

Odantapuri is considered to have been the second-oldest of India's Mahaviharas, and it is believed to have been located on or at the foot of Bari Pahari (English: Big Hill), or in the present-day Gadh Par locality of Bihar Sharif. According to Tibetan records it housed about 12,000 students and was an important centre of Buddhist learning. Acharya Sri Ganga of Vikramashila was a student there.

The Big Hill or Badi Pahadi was known as Pashravati at the time.

Odantapuri was part of a network of five Mahaviharas in eastern India. The others were Nalanda, Vikramashila, Somapura, and Jagaddala. During the Pala period, the state funding to Vikramshila and Odantapuri far exceeded what was granted to Nalanda. As a result, while Nalanda was struggling for survival around 11th century CE, Odantapuri had a rival institution thriving under the royal patronage of Palas.

=== Conquests and dynastic transitions ===
In 1193, during the time of Ikhtiyar ad-Din Muhammad bin Bakhtiyar Khilji's conquest of Bihar, he came to conquer eastern parts of India and destroyed Nalanda University. En route to Nalanda, he allegedly damaged the Buddhist monasteries of a place now called Bakhtiyarpur. He then came to Vihar, where he completely destroyed Odantapuri University, and the Buddhist viharas before leaving for Nalanda. In Koshak, Nalanda, he appointed Qazi Syed Ibrahim Danishmand as the Qazi-ul-Quzat of Bihar making him incharge of enforcing Sharia law in the region. A few years after Khilji's departure, local Bundela Rajput regained control of the city from its Muslim rulers. Bundela Rajputs then ruled the area until the reign of Raja Biththal.

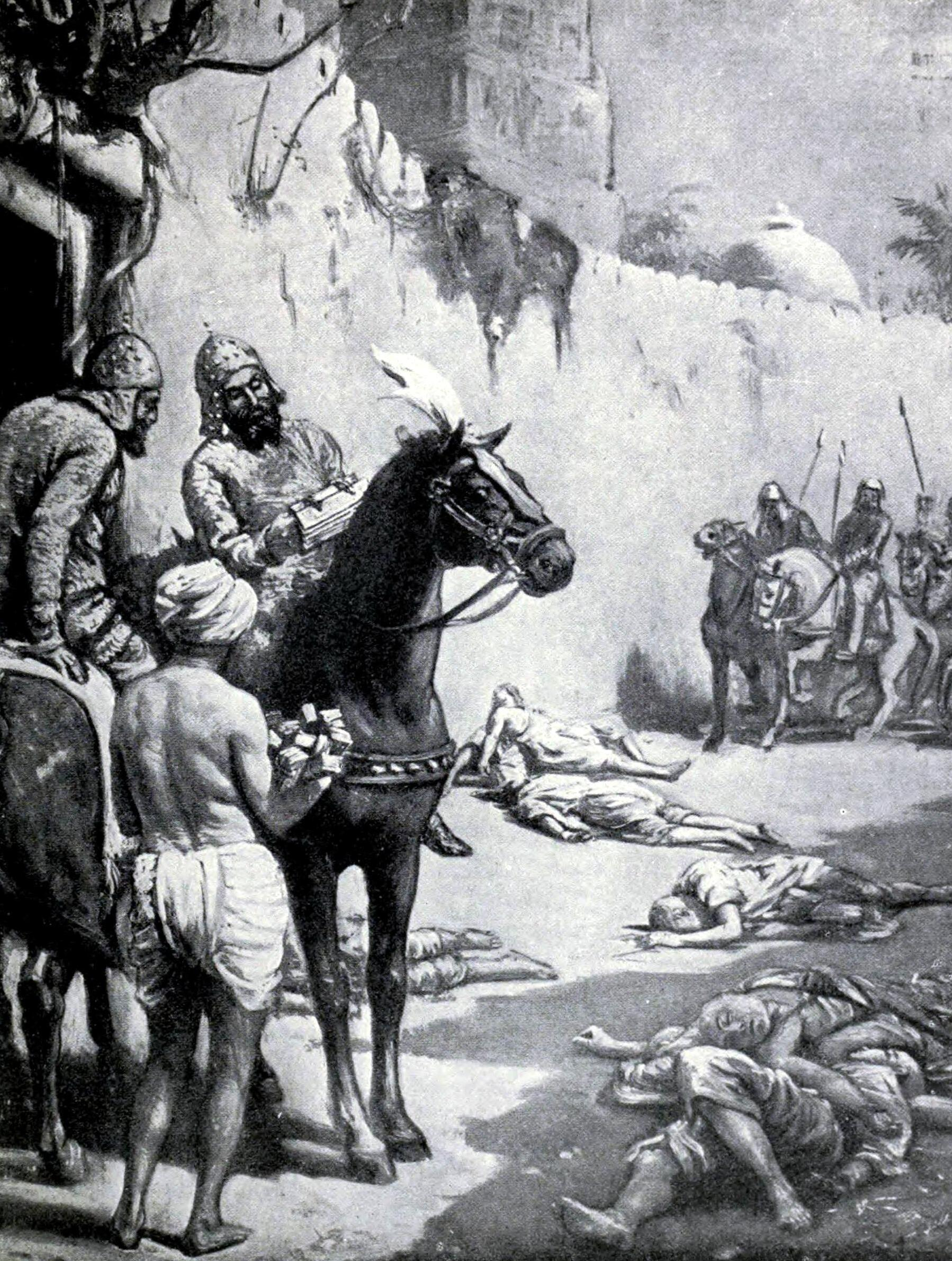
Bakhtiyar Khalji's massacre of Buddhist monks in Bihar, India. Khaliji destroyed the Nalanda, Vikramashila, and Odantapuri universities during his raids across North Indian plains, massacring many Buddhist and Brahmin scholars.

The district of Nalanda formed a part of the territory under Muslim rulers of Bengal till 1320 AD when Ghiyasuddin Tughlaq separated Bihar from Bengal.

Delhi Sultan Muhammad bin Tughluq (r.1324–1351 CE) then sent Syed Ibrahim Mallick with an army to conquer the Magadha region. After a fierce battle, the outnumbered Raja army was defeated and Raja Biththal was killed. The conquest of Bihar was a major achievement for Delhi, and on this occasion the Sultan conferred upon Syed Ibrahim Mallick the title of "Madarul Mulk", after which he was called "Mallick Baya". He was then appointed governor of Bihar by the Sultan, and he ruled over the region until his assassination in 1353 CE.

Its control passed into the hands of the Sherqui Dynasty of Jaunpur from 1394 to 1486 CE. After that it was amalgamated with the Muslim kingdom of Gauda.

=== Later history ===
After the Delhi Sultanate, the first Sur emperor, Sher Shah Suri (r. 1540–1545 CE), moved the regional capital to Patliputra (modern-day Patna), and the whole Magadha region came to be called Bihar. Before that the residence of the Muslim governors of Bihar remained at Bihar Sharif until 1541 CE. Patna became a central place and Bihar Sharif lost its importance.

After that the British took control of the entire city and it came under British colonial rule during the 18th and 19th centuries. The British period brought about changes in administration, infrastructure, and governance in Bihar Sharif and the surrounding region. In 1867, the city was officially declared a municipality.

=== Modern period ===
In the post-independence era, Bihar Sharif has continued to be an important center of culture, education, and commerce in Bihar. The city has witnessed urbanization and development, while still retaining its historical and cultural significance.

== Geography ==
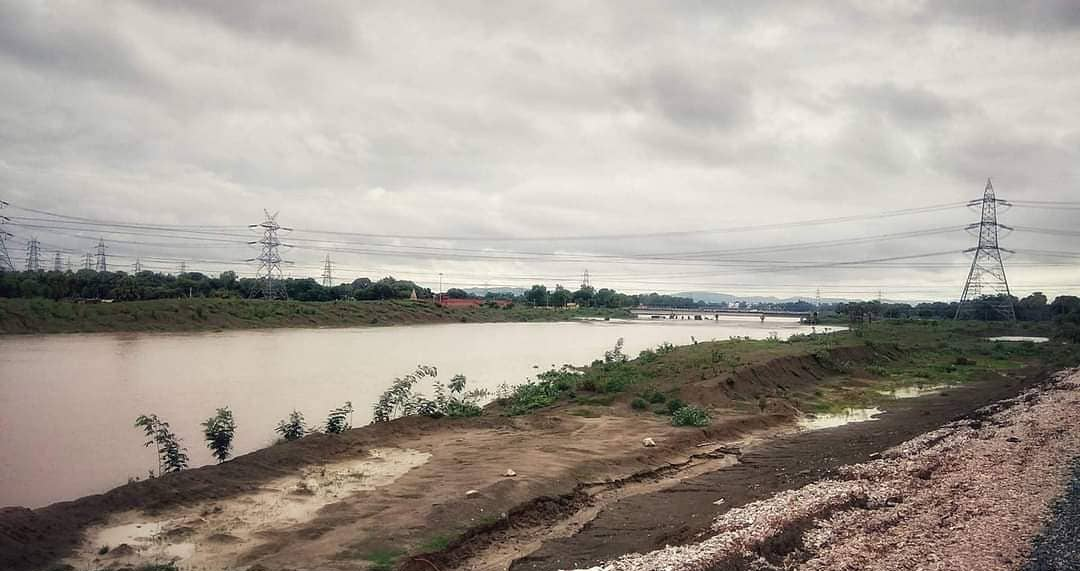
Panchane river entering Bihar Sharif

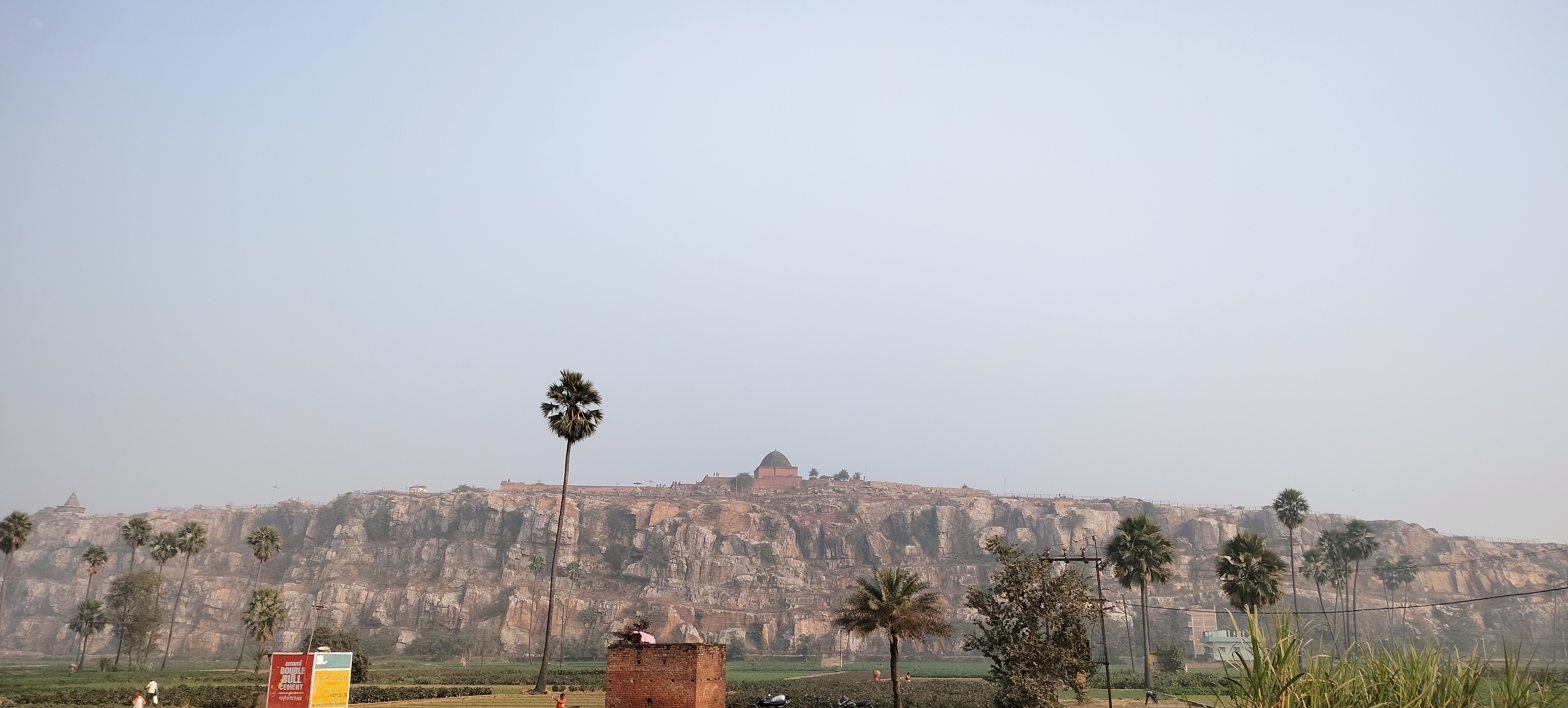
Backside view of Badi Pahadi Hill

Bihar Sharif is located 74 km (46 mi) from Patna, the capital of Bihar state (via NH30 and 20). It is situated at the foot of Bari Pahari (a.k.a. Peer Pahari(Monday Mountain )and on the bank of the Panchanan (Panchane) River. The land around Bihar Sharif is very fertile, with alluvial soil deposited by several rivers. These local rivers include the Mahane, the Panchane – which divides west of Pawapuri into the Goithwa, Soyaba and smaller rivers – the Zerain, and others. To the west is the Paimar River, a tributary of the Ganges.

== Demographics ==
As of the 2011 India census, Bihar Sharif had a population of 297,268, up from 231,972 in 2001 and around 130,000 in 1981. The sex ratio was 916 females per 1000 males, with a slightly higher ratio of 927 females per 1,000 males among children. The overall literacy rate was 75.30%, with male literacy at 80.80% and female literacy at 69.28%.

=== Religion ===
Religions in Bihar Sharif
Religion	Percent
Hindus	65.86%
Muslims	33.59%
Others†	0.54%
Distribution of religions †Includes Sikhs (0.01%), Buddhists (0.01%).

According to the 2011 census, 65.86% of the city's population identifies as Hindu, 33.59% identifies as Muslim, 0.34% did not answer the census question, 0.17% identifies as Christian, and fewer than fifty identified with each of the other religious groups on the survey. A 1981 report lists a 48% proportion of Muslims and notes this as unusual for the area.

In 2012, plans were announced for the construction of a local Bahá'í House of Worship in Bihar Sharif. This would be only the second House of Worship for India's nearly two million Bahá'ís (the first being the well-known Lotus Temple in Delhi), and one of the first two local Bahá'í Houses of Worship in Asia (the other being in Battambang, Cambodia). The final model of the house of worship was unveiled in April 2020 and its foundation has been laid on 21 February 2021 and is expected to get completed by 2023.

== Administration ==
- The Town Police Station (Bihar Thana) is the first child-friendly police station in the state of Bihar.

== Economy ==
Agricultural trade and Education are the two main economic activities of Bihar Sharif, with crops including cauliflower, potato, mustard seed and other vegetables, which are exported to neighbouring states. The region is well known for extensive production of vegetables.

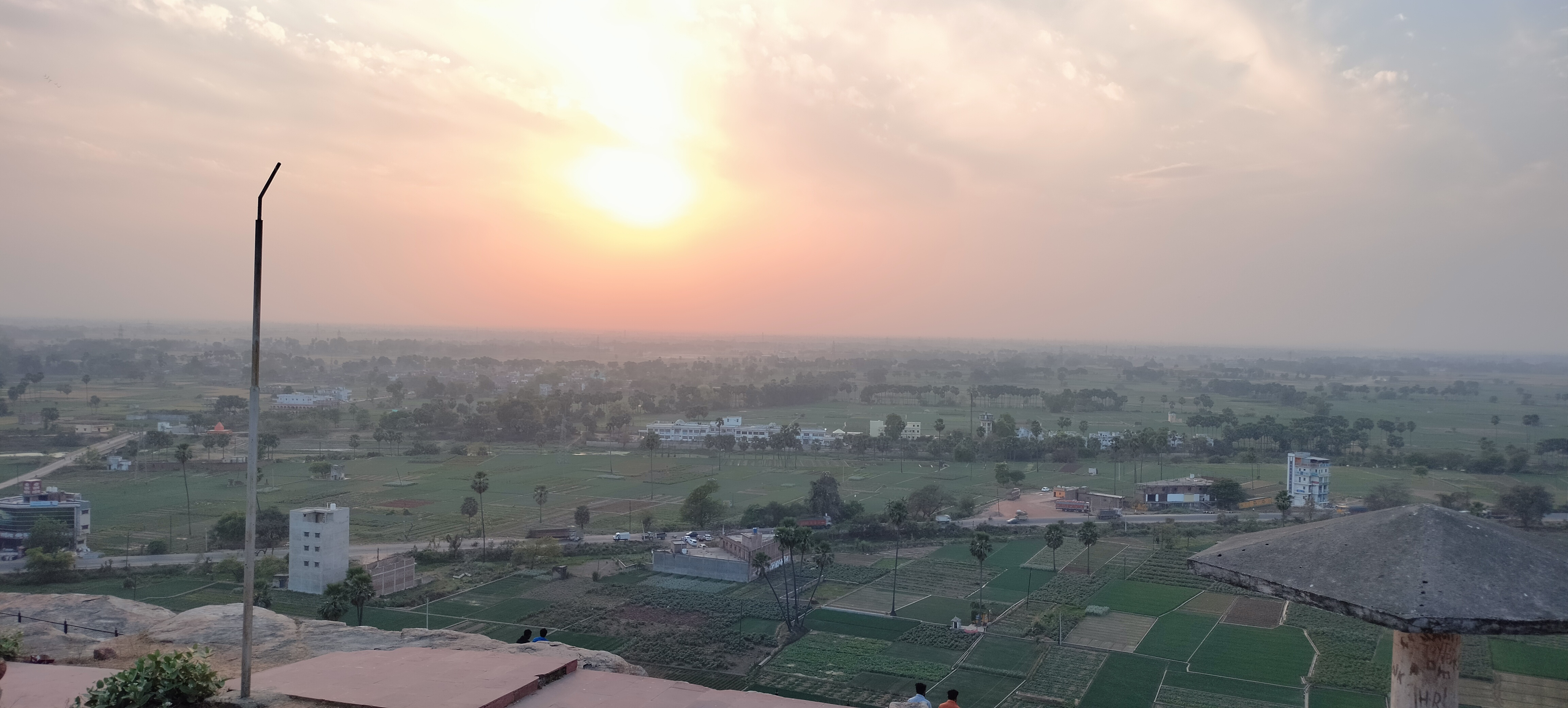
Agricultural fields near the city

Tourism to nearby sites like Nalanda, Rajgir and Pawapuri also boosts the city's economy, as do footwear and garments manufactured by household industries. The locality of Sohsarai in the city hosts an extensive textile market, which is known as "Mini Surat".

As of 1981, the city had a major beedi cigarette industry which employed 15,000 people, mainly Muslims and some lower-caste Hindus.

In recent years the city has changed from a trade-based economy to an education hub.

Bihar Sharif is one of four cities selected in Bihar state among the 100 Indian cities to developed as smart cities under Prime Minister Narendra Modi's flagship Smart Cities Mission. It figured in amongst the ambitious 100 smart cities list to receive funding in the fifth round of the smart cities project in January 2018.

== Culture and cityscape ==
=== Heritage and important sites ===
The city of Bihar Sharif also has the designation of the location of the first museum in Bihar. The first Bihar Museum, established here in the late 19th century by Alexander Meyrick Broadley was not just the oldest museum in Bihar but also one of the oldest in India. Broadley was the district magistrate of Bihar Sharif in 1860s and one of the earliest surveyors and explorers of Bihar. During the course of his amateur excavations, he collected many sculptures and architectural fragments, with which he established a museum at the Collector's Bungalow at Bihar Sharif in 1871–1872. The collection recorded at least 686 artefacts. In 1891, the governor of Bengal of decided to transfer the contents of the Bihar Museum to Indian Museum in Calcutta. After the foundation of Patna Museum, a significant part of the collection was transferred there, listed in the catalogue as from Broadley Collection.

The Bihar Sharif Pillar Inscriptions from the Gupta Empire were found in front of the northern gate of the fort of Bihar (Bihar Sharif). The pillar was removed and set up on a brick pedestal opposite the Bihar Court House, and then later transferred to the Patna Museum.

The city has many artefacts and relics of Buddhist and Jain heritage. Mahavira, often regarded as the founder of Jainism, is said to have attained Nirvana at the nearby town of Pawapuri, where the famous Jal Mandir is situated. Broken idols of Buddha and Mahavira can be found in the Nalanda Museum and in many temples. Nalanda College in Bihar Sharif and the locality of Garhpar are situated on the remains of Odantapuri. The ruins at Nalanda are 13 km (8.1 mi) from Bihar Sharif.

- Badi Dargah

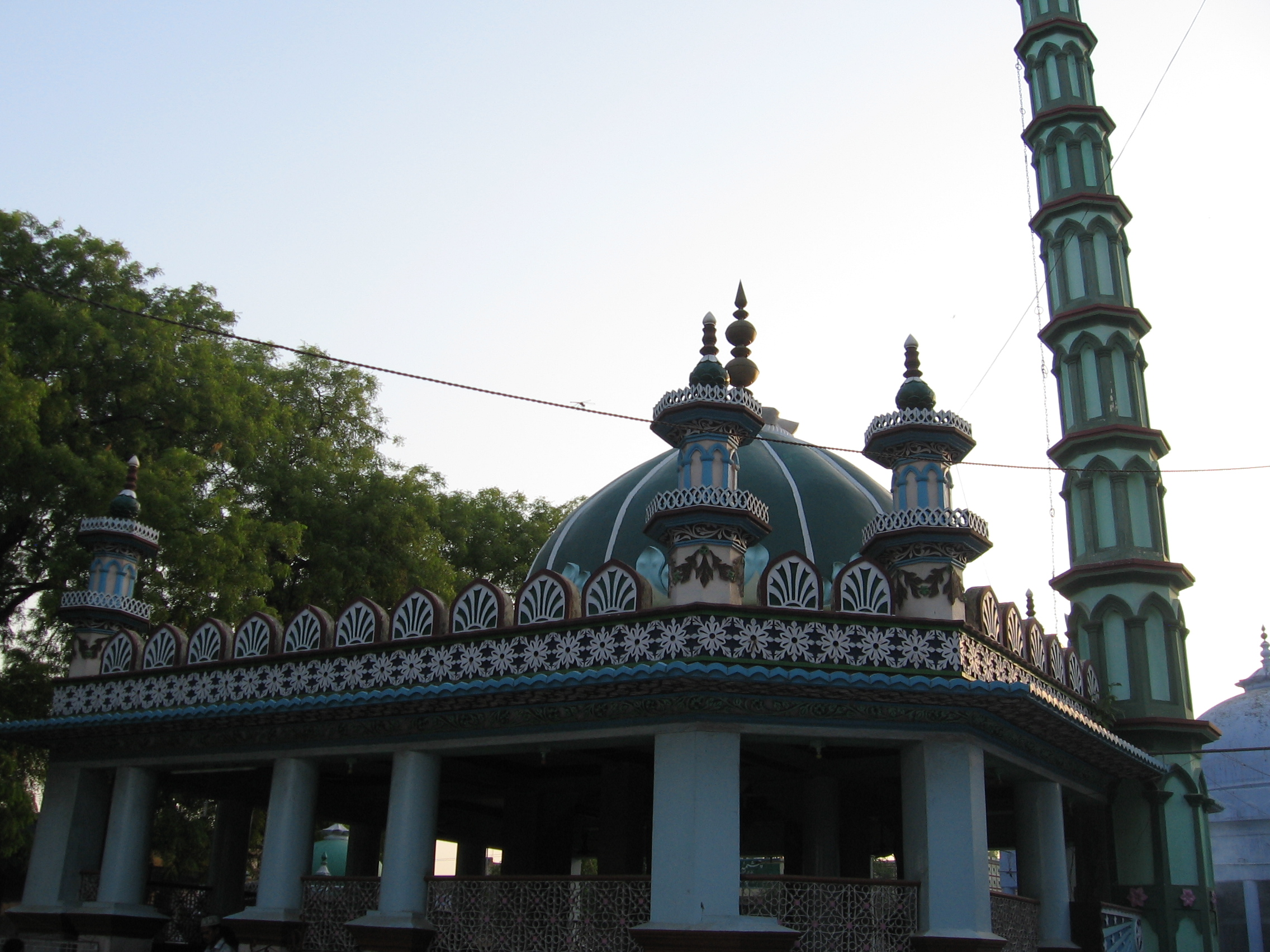
Badi Dargah

The shrine of the Sufi Saint Sheikh Makhdoom Sharfuddin Ahmed Yahya Maneri, is located near the ruins of Odantapuri. He is credited with converting many Hindus in the districts of Patna, Bihar Sharif, Gaya, Jehanabad, Arwal, Nawada, Jamui and Sheikhpura, and many Muslims celebrate Urs at the shrine each year in the month of Shawwal on the Hijri calendar. The inscription over its entrance mentions that the tomb was completed in 1569.

- Baba Maniram Akhara

Another notable site in the city is the Langot Fair at Baba Maniram Akhara; the Akhara of Sant Maniram was founded by Raja Biththal to train youth in fighting.

- Mausoleum of Syed Ibrahim Mallick Baya

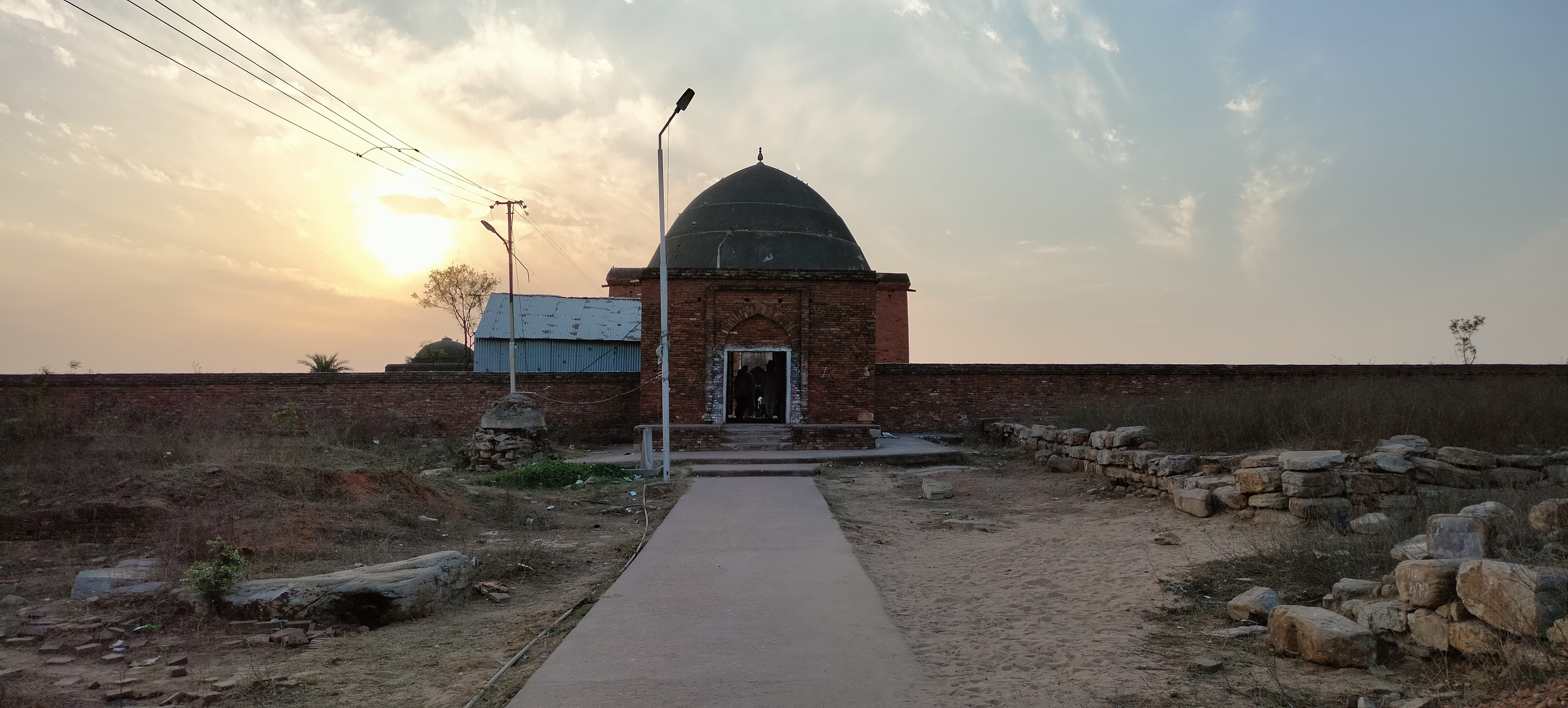
Tomb of Syed Ibrahim Mallick Baya

The mausoleum of Syed Ibrahim Mallick Baya is presently located on the top of the hill known as Hiranya Parvata. It was built in 14th century CE.

- Badi Pahari

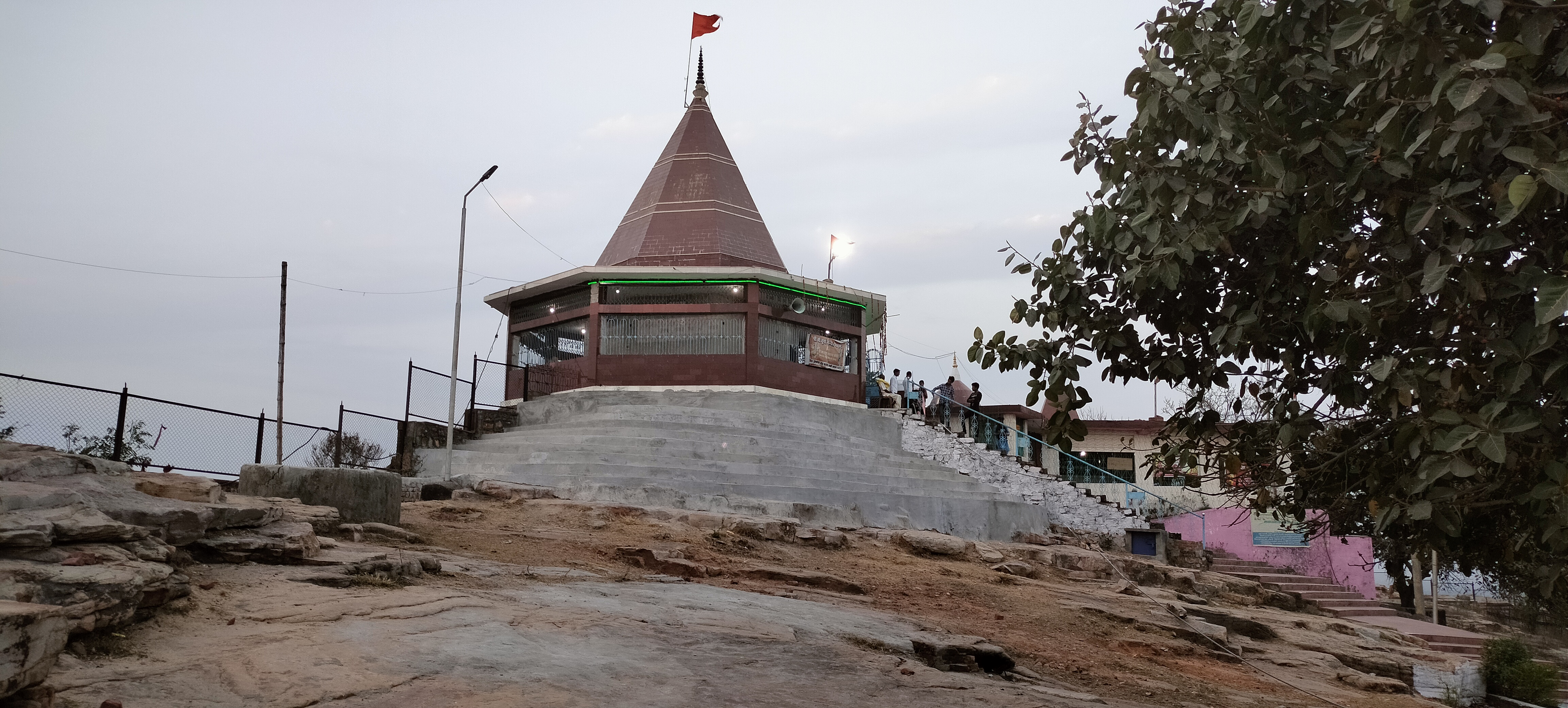
Temple on Badi Pahari Bihar Sharif

Badi Pahadi, also known as Hiranya Parvat, has a large park, a temple and the mausoleum of Syed Ibrahim Mallick Baya located on it. Most tourists visiting Biharsharif are domestic - from other places in Bihar and adjoining states.

- Bihar Sharif Museum

Housed in the building known as "Virasat Bihar", this museum opened in 1979. It houses relics and sculptures unearthed from the city and nearby areas as the area is very rich in archaeological remains. The stone sculptures housed here mostly belong to the Pala Empire period. There are medieval period sculptures, ancient pillars, Islamic inscriptions and Mughal coins.

- Mora Talab

A large tank said to be constructed by Queen Moora Devi, mother of the Mauryan Emperor Chandragupta Maurya. A Sun Temple is located here. This place is located by the NH 20 on the northern side of the city.

- Nagar Nigam Park

Nagar Nigam Park is a park developed by the Municipal Corporation of Bihar Sharif on Badi Pahadi. The park features several fountains and cascades along with a children's park.

=== Events ===
- Urs or Annual "Chiraga" Fair
- Annual Langot Fair held at Manibaba Akhara

== Transport ==
=== Roadways ===
The city is connected by road to major cities like Patna, Rajgir, Nalanda, Nawada, Mehsi, Harnaut, Jamshedpur, Ranchi, Dhanbad, Bokaro, Koderma, Kolkata, Gaya, Hazaribag, Barhi, Jehanabad, Bakhtiyarpur, Barh, Mokama, Munger, Purnea and Ramgarh. Being the district headquarters, it is a major transport hub and has regular bus service to all other major destinations in the region.

NH 33 and NH 20, a part of Asian Highway Network and AH42 passes through the city. NH 33 and NH 20 intersects each other in the city. NH 20 connects to Patna via Bakhtiyarpur and to Nawada, Barhi, Koderma, Hazaribagh and Ranchi. NH 33 connects the city to Mokama, Barbigha, Asthawan, Jahanabad and Arwal.

NH 120 starts here and runs to Dumraon via Nalanda, Rajgir and Gaya.

SH 78 connects it with Chandi, Daniyawan and Hilsa.

=== Public transport ===
Bihar Sharif is a part of the Intercity bus service of Bihar State Road Transport Corporation and Patna City bus service. So, state-owned Intercity bus services to the State capital Patna is available at very short intervals. BSRTC also provides City Bus services from Bihar Sharif to Rajgir, Nawada, Barh and Jamui.

Bihar Sharif also comes under the first Intercity Electric bus service in Bihar as a part of Patna–Rajgir route started in March 2021.

=== Railways ===
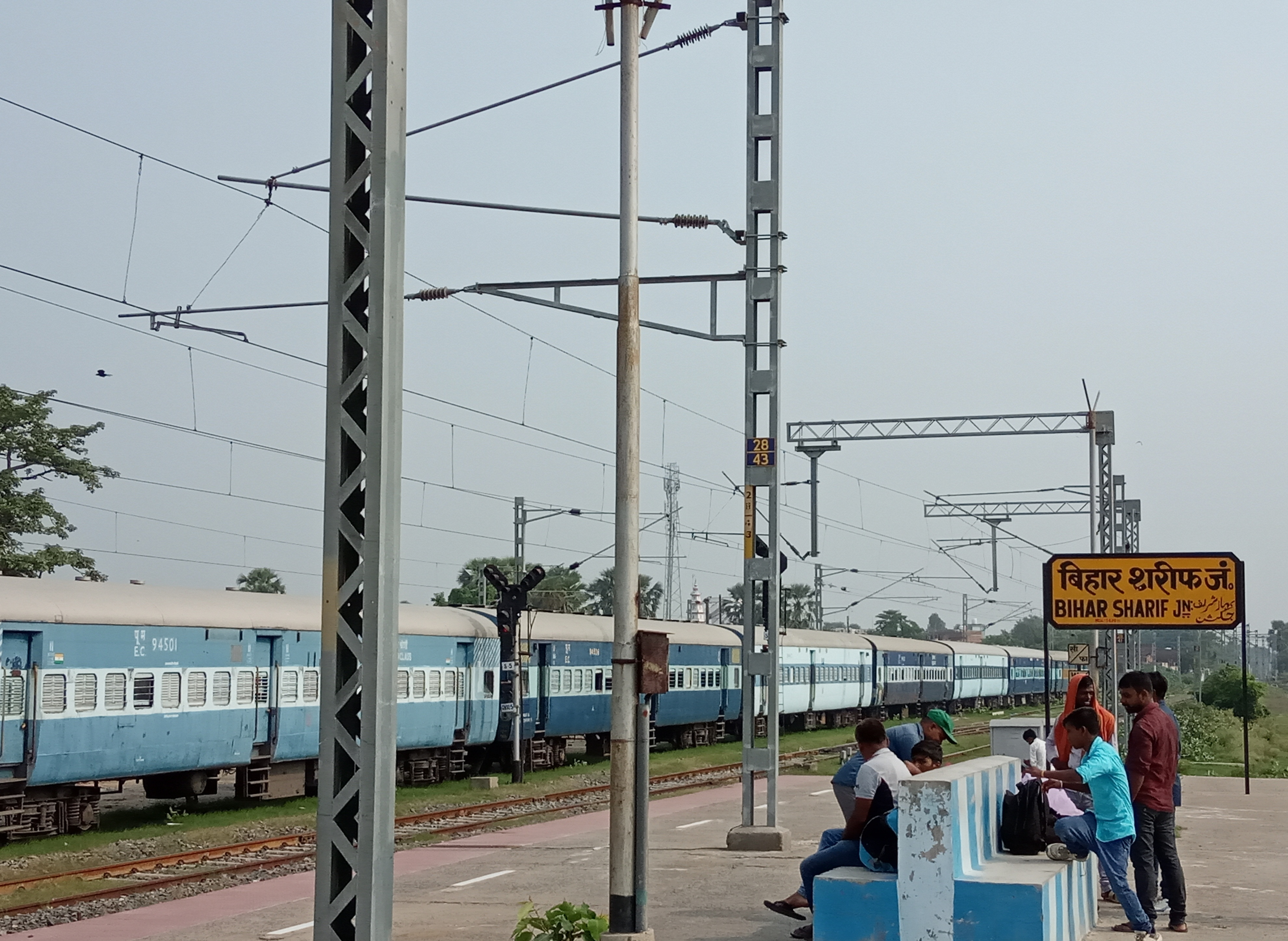
Bihar Sharif Junction

Bihar Sharif Junction is on the Bakhtiyarpur-Tilaiya line, part of the national broad gauge network. The city is served by the Shramjeevi Express, a direct daily train to New Delhi. There are also numerous passenger and express connections to the state capital, Patna, and to the hub at Rajgir which connects to many destinations in the country. Recently, the Fatuha–Islampur branch line has been connected to this route by linking Daniyawan to Bihar Sharif. The extension of passenger services to link Bihar Sharif with Hilsa, Sheikhpura and Gaya began in 2013.

=== Airways ===
- The nearest airport is Patna Airport, about 86 km away, with carriers operating flights to major Indian cities.
- Gaya International Airport is about 95 km away.

== Education ==
A number of colleges, schools and educational institutions are located in the city. Notable institutions include:

=== Universities ===
- K. K. University

=== Colleges ===
- Nalanda College, second oldest college of Bihar.
- Sardar Patel Memorial College
- Nalanda Mahila College
- Kisan College, Nalanda

== Media and entertainment ==
Hindi dailies such as Dainik Jagran, Hindustan, Dainik Bhaskar, Prabhat Khabar, Aj and other local dailies are available as well as English-language newspapers including Times of India, The Hindu along with various types of magazines.

Keshav Ram Bhatta, a Maharashtrian Brahman that settled in Bihar Sharif published Bihar Bandhu, the first Hindi newspaper from Bihar in 1872.

== In popular culture ==
Director Prakash Jha's National Award-winning documentary film Faces after Storms (1981) was based on the incident of communal riots that took place in Bihar Sharif in May 1981.

== Notable people ==
- Shah Amanat, prominent Sufi figure
- Aasim Bihari, social activist
- Zafar Iqbal, former Indian field hockey player and captain
- Saba Karim, former Indian cricketer
- Vikas Kumar, actor
- Sharfuddin Yahya Maneri, a Sufi mystic
- L. S. N. Prasad, Indian paediatrician and Padma Shri recipient
- Vijay Kumar Yadav, former Member of Parliament from Nalanda

== See also ==
Mirza Halim Shah Dargah

- Nalanda
- List of cities in Bihar
- Bihar Aur Sufivad
