= Mograpara =

Coordinates: 23.634°N 90.587°E

Mograpara is medieval settlement in Sonargaon in present-day Bangladesh. It is believed to be the oldest Muslim settlement in Sonargaon.

== History ==
Mograpara was known as Rathkhola, which means chariot yard in native language, during the rule of last Hindu king of Sonargaon. Mograpara contains remnants of historic mosques and tombs which shows it was a thriving Muslim settlement. It contains the tomb of Ghiyasuddin Azam Shah. The sight holds Goaldi Mosque, Yusufganj Mosque, and Dargabari complex. It was a famous Islamic learning center in the 13th century when Mawlana Sharfuddin Abu Tawwama operated an Islamic seminary here. The sight holds the ruins of a treasury and music halls which indicate it might be an administrative headquarters of Muslim rulers.

== Present ==
Mograpara is today a busy village on the edges of Dhaka-Chittagong Highway and is located in Mugra Para Union in Sonargaon Upazila. It is a densely populated area.
