= Waheed Allahabadi =

Indian poet (1829–1892)

- Born: Waheeduddin Ahmad; 1829
- Died: 1892 (aged 62–63)
- Occupation: Poet
- Writing career
- Language: Urdu

Waheed Allahabadi (born Waheeduddin Ahmad; 1829–1892) was an Urdu-language Indian Poet. He was the teacher of Mubarak Azimabadi, Benazir Shah Warsi, Akbar Allahabadi and Shah Akbar Danapuri in poetry. He was a student of Khwaja Haidar Ali Aatish.
