= Sharfuddin Yahya Maneri =

Sufi mystic of medieval India

Sharfuddin Ahmed Yahya Maneri
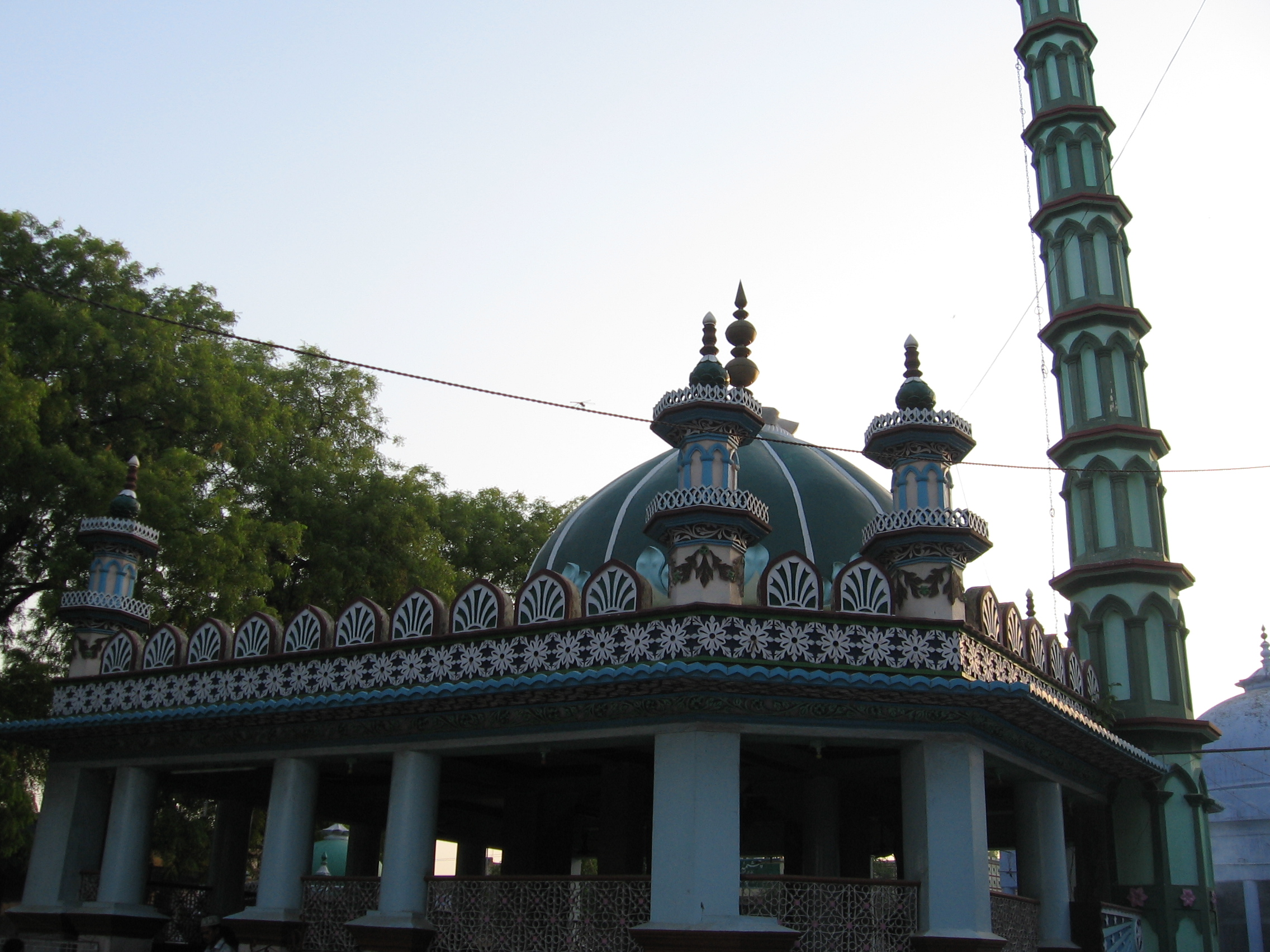
- A picture of Badi Dargah

Personal life
- Born: July 1263 A.D. (29 Sha'aban 661 A.H.) Maner, Bihar
- Died: January 1381 A.D.(6 Shawwal 782 Hijri)
- Resting place: Badi Dargah, Bihar Sharif, Bihar; Dargah 25°10′49″N 85°31′10″E
- Home town: Maner, Bihar
- Parent: Makhdoom Yahya Maneri (father)
- Known for: Sufi Saint

Religious life
- Religion: Islam

Muslim leader
- Teacher: Sharfuddin Abu Tawwama

Sharfuddin Ahmed Yahya Maneri, popularly known as Makhdoom-ul-Mulk Bihari and Makhdoom-e-Jahan (1263–1381), was a 13th-century Sufi mystic and saint active in medieval Bihar.

He was a maternal grandson of Pir Jagjot(Sayyid Shihab Ad-Din Suhrawardi) who was the first Suhrawardi saint to come into India as well as the direct student of the famous Shihab Ad-Din Abu Hafs 'Umar Suhrawardi and of Najm Ad-Din Kubra, the founder of the Kubrawiyya Order.

== Early life ==
Sharafuddin Ahmad Yahya Maneri was born in Maner, a village near Patna in Bihar circa August 1263 to Kamaluddin Yahya Maneri bin Shaikh Israil Maneri, a Sufi saint of Suhrawardiyya order and Bibi Raziya alias Badi Bua bint Syed Shahabuddin Suhrawardi Peer Jagjot .

His maternal grandfather Peer Jagjot, who is buried at Kachchi Dargah, near the Ganges in Patna district, was also a revered Sufi of the Suhrawardiyya order. At age 12, he left Maner to gain traditional knowledge of Arabic, Persian, logic, philosophy and religion. He was tutored by Sharfuddin Abu Towama Bukhari, an Islamic scholar from Sonargaon, Bengal with whom he spent about 24 years.

At first, he refused to marry but, upon falling ill, he married Bibi Badaam, daughter of Abu Tawwama. He left home after the birth of his son Shaikh Zakiuddin Maneri in 1289 A.D. His son lived and died in Bengal.

His lineage is given as:

1: 'Abd Al-Muttalib Ibn Hashim

2: Zubayr Ibn 'Abd Al-Muttalib

3: Abu Zar 'Abd Allah Ibn Zubayr

4: Abu Sa'id Mas'ud

5: Abu Ad-Din

6: Abu Suhma

7: Abu Duhra

8: Shaykh Abu Al-Layl

9: Shaykh Abu Al-Layth

10: Imam Abu Al-Fatah

11: Abu Sa'id

12: Abu Saima

13: Abul Qasim

14: Muhammad Abu Al-Fatah

15: Imam Abu Bakr

16: Imam Taj Al-Faqih Al-Hashimi

17: Kamal Ad-Din Yahya Maneri

18: Sharf Ad-Din Yahya Maneri

== Career ==
After completing his education he left for Delhi where he met Nizamuddin and other Sufis. His elder brother Makhdoom Jaleeluddin Maneri (buried at Badi Dargah in Maner Sharif) accompanied him there and introduced him to his pir (spiritual guide) Sheikh Najeebuddin Firdausi. In Delhi, he became a disciple of Sheikh Najeebuddin Firdausi of Mehrauli and was given the title of Firdausi.

To shun material comforts, Sheikh Sharfuddin Ahmed bin Yahya Maneri went into the forest of Bihiya (about 15 miles west of Maner). He later went to Rajgir (about 75 miles east of Maner) where he performed ascetic exercises in the hills. In his memory, a hot spring close to a place where he often prayed in Rajgir is named Makhdoom Kund.

After 30 years in the forests, Sheikh Sharfuddin Ahmed bin Yahya Maneri settled at Bihar Sharif. Later Sultan Muhammad Tughlaq built a Khanqah for him where he taught and trained disciples in Sufism (Tasawwuf). He devoted his life to teaching and writing.

== Bibliography ==
The collection of his letters (Maktoobat) and sermons (Malfoozat) received wide acclaim. His Maktoobat is regarded as a 'working manual' amongst the highest in Sufi circles.

- Jackson, Paul (2002). Sharfuddin Maneri: The Hundred Letters. Patna: Khuda Baksh Oriental Library.
- Muti-ul-Imam, Syed (1993). Shaiky Sharfuddin Ahmad Bin Yahya Muneeri (in Urdu). Islamabad: Markaz Tahqiqat Farsi Iran-o-Pakistan.
- Munemi, Syed Shah Shamimuddin Ahmed (1998). Hazrat Makhdoom-e-Jahan Sheikh Sharfuddin Yahya Maneri: Jeevan Aur Sandesh (in Hindi) (1st ed.). Bihar Sharif: Maktab-e-Sharaf.
- Munemi, Syed Shah Shamimuddin Ahmed (2011). Makhdoom-e-Jahan Shaikh Sharfuddin Yahya Maneri: Jeevan Aur Sandesh (in Hindi) (2nd ed.). Bihar Sharif: Madrasa Asdaqiya Makhdoom Sharaf.
- Maktubat-i-Sadi, a 'Series of a Hundred Letters' (essays on definite subjects) addressed to his disciple Qazi Shamsuddîn in 747 Hijra.
- Maktubat-i-Bist-o-hasht, a 'Series of 28 Letters', replies to the correspondence of his senior disciple, Muzaffar, the prince of Balkh.
- Fawaed-i-Ruknî, brief Notes prepared for the use of his disciple Rukn-ud-dîn.

== Death ==
He died in 1381 A.D. (6 Shawwal, 782 Hijri).

The funeral prayer was said according to his will, which decreed that a Sufi lead it from Semnan who was on his way to Pandua in Malda district of West Bengal to pledge spiritual allegiance on the hands of the Alaul Haq Pandavi and enter into the Chishti spiritual order. Accordingly, Syed Ashraf Jahangir Semnani led the funeral prayers.

His tomb lies at Badi Dargah (Bihar Sharif Nalanda), in a mosque to the east of a large tank, with masonry walls ghats, and pillared porticos. The tomb is situated in an enclosure half-filled with graves and ancient trees, on the north and west of which are three domed mosques and cloisters. His tomb is a place of sanctity for devout Muslims. A five-day Urs is celebrated every year from 5th Shawwal with traditional zeal.
