= Millat Times =

Indian digital news platform

- Website type: Digital news platform
- Available in: Urdu, Hindi, English
- Founded: 2016; 10 years ago
- Headquarters: New Delhi, India
- Founder: Shams Tabrez Qasmi
- Website: Millat Times

Millat Times is an Indian digital news platform that publishes news and analysis in Urdu, Hindi, and English. Founded in 2016 by journalist Shams Tabrez Qasmi, it is headquartered in New Delhi. The platform reports on political developments, communal violence, minority rights, and related social issues, along with fact-checking reports, with a stated focus on stories that receive limited attention in mainstream media. It has expanded its digital presence through a website, a YouTube channel, and various social media platforms.

Since its inception, Millat Times has received attention for its coverage of communal violence, minority issues, and fact-checking reports. It has also faced challenges, including social media restrictions and legal notices related to its reporting. Some journalists and public figures have described the platform as contributing to independent and alternative media in India.

== History ==
Millat Times was founded in 2016 by journalist Shams Tabrez Qasmi, who serves as its Chief Editor. The platform was launched in January 2016 at a seminar in Mumbai attended by Rabey Hasani Nadwi, then President of the All India Muslim Personal Law Board.

Initially launched as an Urdu-language digital news platform, it introduced an English edition in April 2016. Muhammad Irshad Ayub served as one of the founding members and as the first editor of the English portal. It later expanded to include a Hindi edition.

In 2017, Millat Times launched a YouTube channel under the same name. Its first interview featured Lok Sabha MP Asaduddin Owaisi. As of December 2020, some videos had over one million views, and the channel had more than 800,000 subscribers.

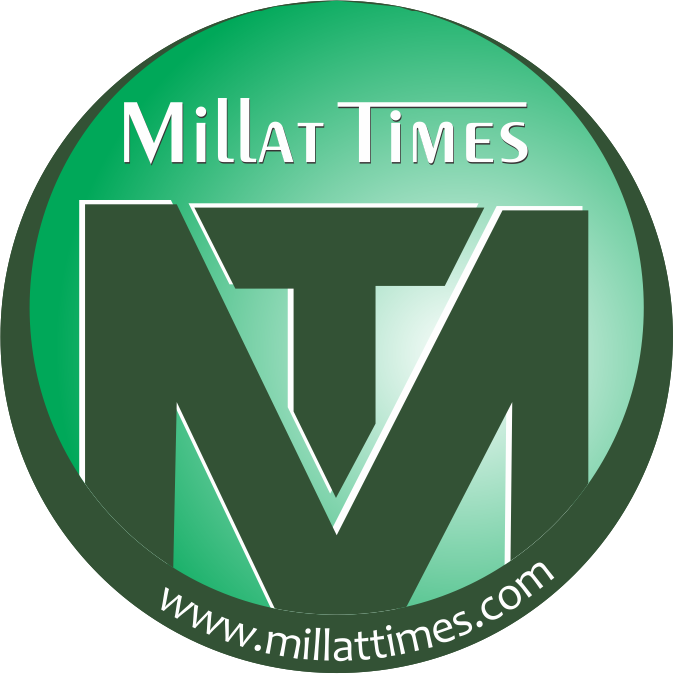
Millat Times' previous logo (as of 2019)

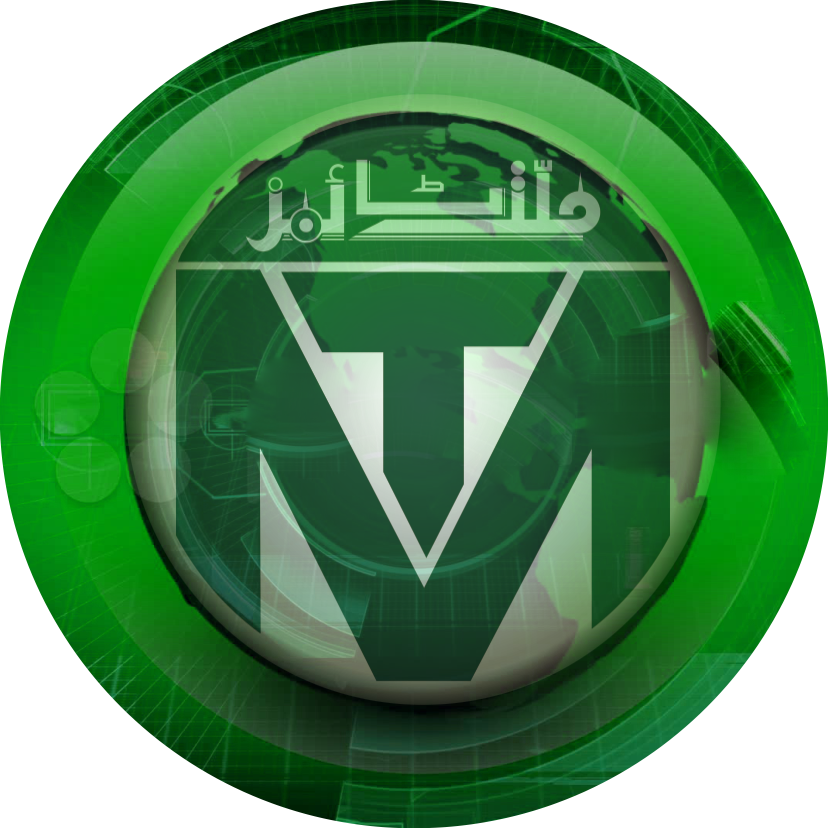
Millat Times' old logo (2017)

== Content and coverage ==
Millat Times publishes news and analysis on political developments, social issues, minority rights, and international affairs, and has been described as focusing on issues often overlooked by mainstream media.

The platform has reported on a range of events, including communal violence in Sitamarhi, Bihar in 2018, protests against the Triple Talaq Bill the same year, and the Citizenship Amendment Act (CAA) protests in 2020, where it covered instances such as Sikh community support for the Shaheen Bagh demonstrations. It has also reported on electoral issues, including allegations by Muslim voters during the 2022 Rampur by-elections that they were prevented from voting, and has published fact-checking reports, such as debunking claims in 2023 that Shahi Imam Syed Ahmed Bukhari had joined the Bharatiya Janata Party.

== Digital presence ==
Millat Times operates a website and a YouTube channel. It also engages audiences via Facebook and other social media platforms. Millat Times states that its readership extends beyond India, including the Middle East, the UK, and the US.

== Recognition and events ==
In January 2025, Millat Times celebrated its 9th anniversary at the Press Club of India. The event featured notable figures such as former Foreign Minister Salman Khurshid, Rajya Sabha MP Imran Pratapgarhi, former MP Mohammad Adeeb, and journalist Bhasha Singh. Speakers at the event, as reported by the sources, praised Millat Times for its contributions to independent journalism and alternative media in India.

== Challenges and censorship ==
Millat Times has reported facing multiple challenges, including legal notices and social media restrictions. In recent years, these have included the suspension of its Facebook page, which had over one million followers.

In October 2018, during the communal violence in Sitamarhi, Bihar, Millat Times published a video of the attack on Zainul Haq Ansari, following which Patna Police issued a notice to the media platform.

In April 2021, a photo circulated on the Millat Times Facebook page purportedly showed a COVID-19 patient in Patna, India, being transported on a motorcycle with an oxygen cylinder. However, according to AFP Fact Check, the image was originally taken in Barishal, Bangladesh, and not in India. The AFP report included a comparison showing two versions of the image: one labeled "original post" and another marked "misleading post", which featured the Millat Times logo, indicating that the outlet had shared the content in a misrepresented context.

In December 2021, Facebook deleted the official page of Millat Times, which had over one million followers, without any prior notice. The move drew criticism from supporters and triggered demands for its restoration.

In April 2021, YouTube blocked Millat Times' channel for 90 days after it uploaded a video on lockdown protests by daily wage workers in Maharashtra, citing "medical misinformation." Editor Shams Tabrez Qasmi defended the video as factual and alleged that platforms like YouTube and Facebook censored small media outlets covering sensitive issues.

In 2022, editor Shams Tabrez Qasmi was charged for sharing videos of communal violence in Kanpur, Uttar Pradesh, without being given any official notice. A report by Global Voices Advox mentioned that Qasmi and his colleagues have faced harassment and abuse, which Qasmi has stated he attributes to their Muslim identity.

== Reception ==
In a 6 April 2022 Urdu column published by Deutsche Welle, Millat Times founder and editor Shams Tabrez Qasmi was quoted discussing the challenges facing Urdu journalism. Qasmi urged Urdu media to modernize, provide practical training to young journalists, and avoid "cheap politics" in order to revive Urdu's readership and influence.

A 2024 study categorized Millat Times as one of several independent digital media platforms that identify with the Muslim community, while others opt for neutral branding, which the study suggested was to avoid stigmatization.

== See also ==
- Online journalism in India
