= Makhdoom Yahya Maneri =

Indian Sufi saint (??–1323)

Hazrat, Makhdoom, Shaikh Kamaluddin Yahya Maneri
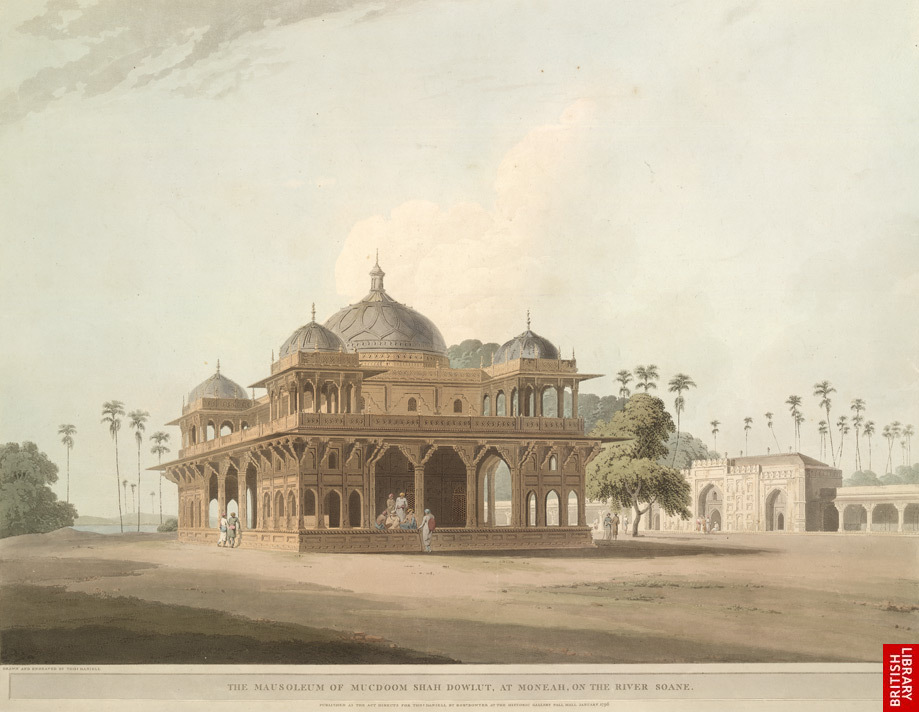
- Mausoleum of Makhdoom Shah Daulat, a descendant of Kamaluddin Yahya Maneri, at Maner
- Official name: Yahya Maneri

Personal life
- Born: Kamaluddin Yahya Quraishi Hashmi Jerusalem
- Died: 1323 Maner Sharif, Bihar
- Resting place: Badi Dargah, Maner Sharif, Bihar
- Home town: Maner Sharif
- Spouse: Bibi Raziya alias Badi Bua
- Children: 5 including Sharfuddin Yahya Maneri
- Parent: Shaikh Imaduddin Israil Maneri (father)
- Region: Bihar
- Education: Nizamiyya of Baghdad
- Occupation: Islamic scholar

Religious life
- Religion: Islam
- Denomination: Sunni Islam
- Jurisprudence: Hanafi
- Tariqa: Suhrawardiyya
- Creed: Maturidi
- Movement: Sufism

Muslim leader
- Disciple of: Shihab al-Din 'Umar al-Suhrawardi

Kamaluddin Yahya Maneri (Urdu: مخدوم کمال الدین یحییٰ منیری; Died 1323) popularly known as Makhdoom Yahya Maneri was an Indian Sufi saint of the 13th century. His tomb is known as Badi Dargah, near a mosque located in Maner Sharif, 29 km from Patna, Bihar, India.

== Early life and education ==
Kamaluddin Yahya Maneri was born to Shaikh Imaduddin Israil Maneri, who came to India from Jerusalem in 1180 with their family. Maneri's father Makhdoom Imaduddin Israil was the eldest son of Imam Muhammad Taj Faqih Hashmi. His father and uncles settled in Maner which was later also called Maner Sharif.

Kamaluddin Yahya Maneri studied Islamic law at the Nizamiyya of Baghdad. He was a disciple of Sheikh Shahab al-Din Abu Hafs Umar al-Suhrawardi of Suhrawardiyya Sufi order. His associates include Baha-ud-din Zakariya, Saadi Shirazi and Kamal al-Din Isma'il al-'Isfahani and Makhdoom Syed Shahabuddin Pir Jagjot of Balkh who settled in Jethuli near Patna.

== Personal life ==
He married Bibi Raziya alias Badi Bua, daughter of Makhdoom Syed Shahabuddin Pir Jagjot and they had four sons and one daughter together including Sharfuddin Yahya Maneri.

== Death and legacy ==
Kamaluddin Yahya Maneri died in 1323 and was buried in Badi Dargah, Maner Sharif near the tomb of his father. The sacred shrine is known as Badi Dargah, while the mausoleum of one of his descendants, Makhdoom Shah Daulat Maneri is known as Chhoti Dargah which is nearby.

Badi Dargah has remained a place of pilgrimage for a long time. Notable visitors include Sikandar Lodi and the Mughal emperor Babur.

Among his descendants, Makhdoom Shah Daulat Maneri died in 1608. His mausoleum Chhoti Dargah was built by Ibrahim Khan Kakar, then Governor of Bihar, and completed in 1616. It is still known as an excellent example of Mughal architecture.

== See also ==
- Sharfuddin Yahya Maneri
