= Joseph David Beglar =

Armenian-Indian archaeologist (1845–1907)

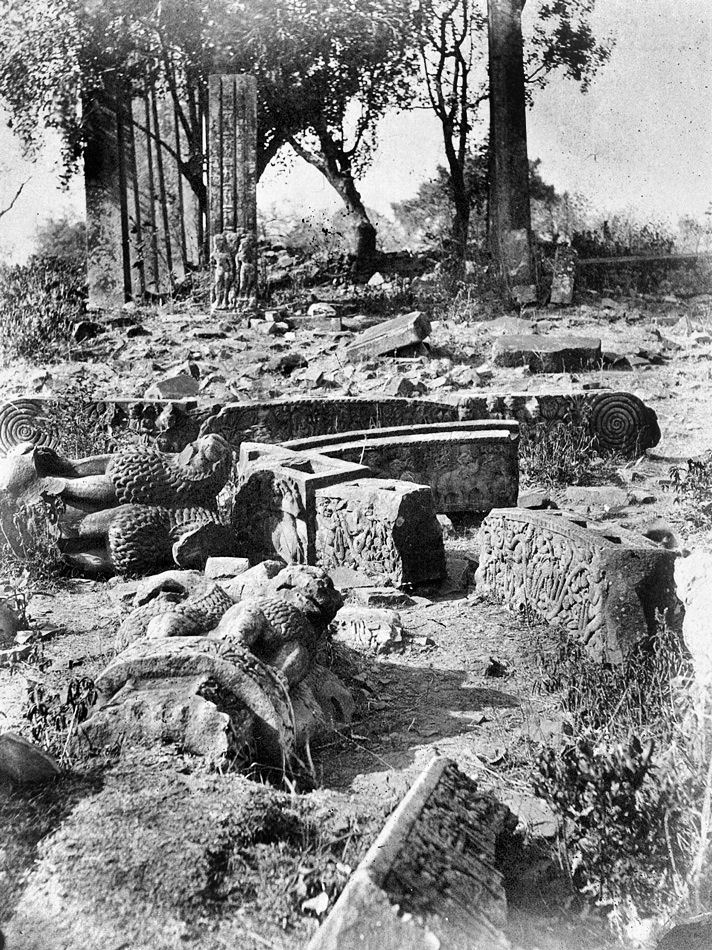
- Ruins of the Southern Gateway, Sanchi in 1875, photographed by Joseph David Beglar.
- Born: 1845; India
- Died: 1907 (aged 61–62)
- Occupations: Engineer, archaeologist
- Employer: Archaeological Survey of India
- Known for: Archaeological Survey of India surveys and excavations
- Notable work: Archaeological surveys in Bengal, Bihar and Central India

Joseph David Beglar, or Joseph David Freedone Melik Beglar (1845–1907), was an Armenian-Indian engineer, archaeologist and photographer working in British India and reporting to the Archaeological Survey of India, known for his images of temples and religious art. He was an assistant of Alexander Cunningham.

== Works ==
- Report of a Tour through the Bengal Provinces (1878) ISBN 978-1021861993
- Report of Tours in the South-eastern Provinces in 1874-75 and 1875-76 Google Books ISBN 978-0666185358
- Report of a Tour in Bundelkhand and Malwa, 1871-72: And in the Central Provinces, 1873-74 ISBN 978-1148070674
- Report for the Year 1871-72- Delhi and Agra ISBN 978-0483641693

== Gallery ==
Life-size statue of a woman at Kichang Singhbhum District in British India.

Pataini temple in British India.

Buddha sculpture, Rajaona in British India.

Statue of four-armed goddess with child.

Buddha sculpture at Ghenjan in British India.

Temples of Hooghly District

== See also ==
- Sir John Hubert Marshall
- Sir Edward Clive Bayley
- Sir Alexander Cunningham
