= Munim Pak =

Indian Sufi saint of Qadiriyya Order (1671-1771)

Makhdoom Munem Pak
- Born: 1671 AD or 1082 hijri Pachna, Sheikhpura district, Bihar
- Died: 1771 AD or 1185 Hijri
- Resting place: Mitan Ghat, Patna district, Bihar; 25°36′17″N 85°13′2″E
- Predecessor: Deewan Syed Khaleeluddin
- Successor: Maulana Syed Hasan Raza Raipuri

Makhdoom Shah Muneem Pak (1671-1771) was an Indian Sufi saint of Qadiriyya Order of Sufism and had Khilafat from Abulolai Naqshbandi order of Sufism. One chain of his silsila is linked with Ahmed Sirhindi.

== Early life and education ==
Munim Pak was born as Shah Muhammad Munim in 1082 hijiri or 1671 AD in Pachna, Bihar (now in Sheikhpura district of Bihar). His family lineage meets up with Shamsuddin Haqqani, a sufi saint buried in Billouri, Lakhisarai and he was descendant of Ibrahim bin Adham Balkhi.

Having completed his primary education at Pachna, he went to Deewan Syed Abu Sayeed Jaafer Muhammad Quadri's khanqah at Barh near Patna, for higher education and knowledge of Sufism. After his death Munim Pak received knowledge from his son Deewan Syed Khaleeluddin and became his "murid" under Qadriyya Qutubiyya order and was rewarded with Khilafah. After finishing his education, he moved to Delhi with the instruction and permission of his peer. or around forty years he taught the students of higher education at the Madrasa situated behind the Jama Masjid in Delhi.

== Works ==
- Mukashifat-e-Munemi (1119 Hijri)
- Ilhamat-e-Munemi (1120 Hijri)
- Mushahidat-e-Munemi (1123 Hijri)
