= Maner, Bihar =

Historic town and Sufi pilgrimage site in Patna district, Bihar, India

Maner मनेर Maner Sharif
- Town
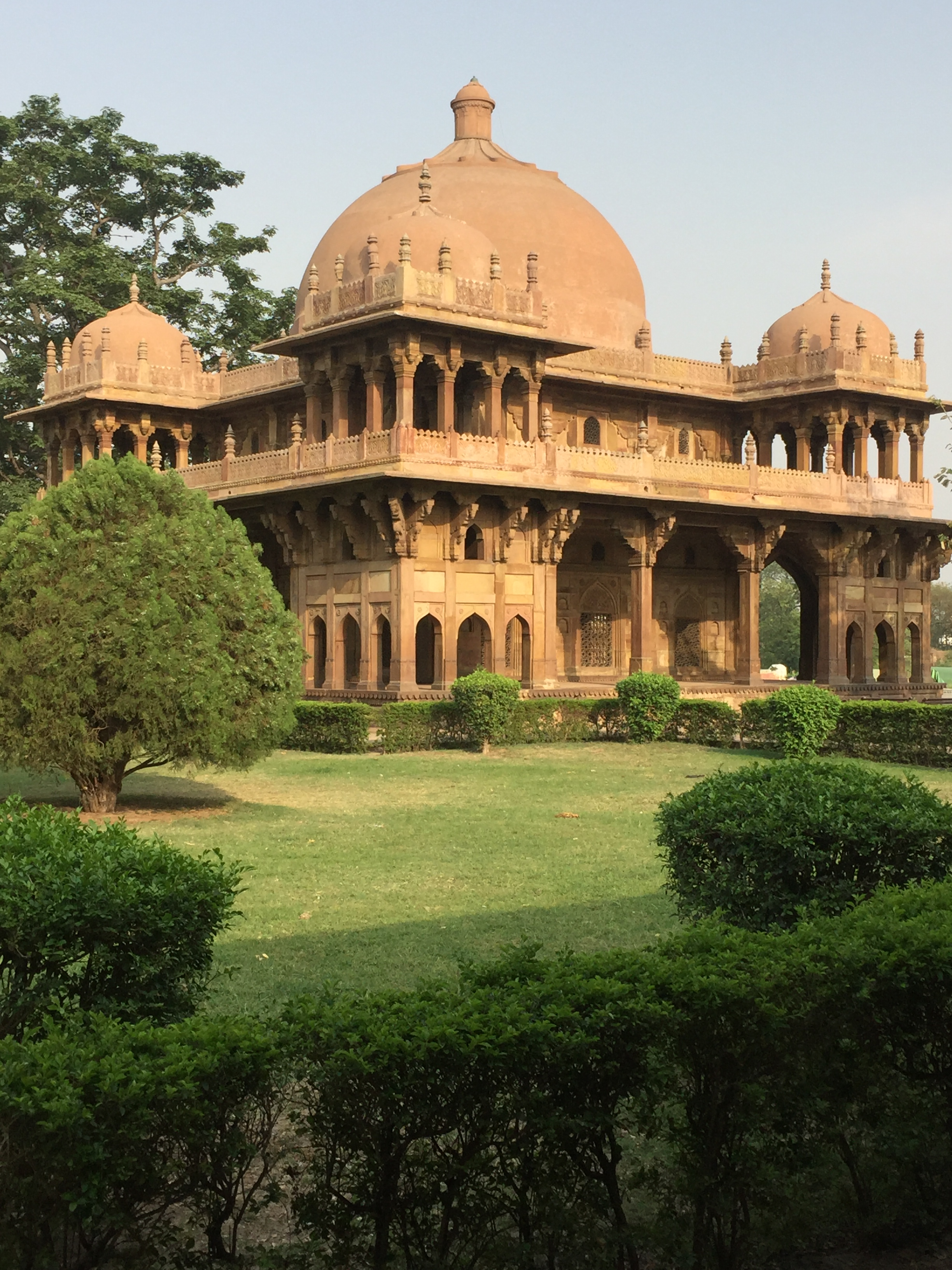
- The Bari Dargah (Tomb of Shah Daulat), a major Sufi shrine
- Nickname: The Land of Sufi Saints
- Location in Bihar, India
- Coordinates: 25.65°N 84.88°E
- Country: India
- State: Bihar
- District: Patna
- Historical significance: 8th–17th century CE

Government
  - Body: Nagar parishad

Area
  - Total: 12.5 km^{2} (4.8 sq mi)
- Elevation: 54 m (177 ft)

Population (2011)
  - Total: 26,912
  - Density: 2,150/km^{2} (5,580/sq mi)

Languages
  - Official: Hindi, Urdu, Magahi
- Time zone: UTC+5:30 (IST)
- Postal code: 801108
- Area code: 0612
- Vehicle registration: BR-01
- Website: patna.nic.in

Maner, also known as Maner Sharif, is a historic town and a block in Patna district of Bihar, India. Situated approximately 24 km west of Patna on NH-922, it is renowned for its Mughal-era dargahs and as an important Sufi pilgrimage center.

== Etymology ==
The ancient name of Maner was Maniyar Mathan, meaning "musical city" in local tradition. The suffix "Sharif" (meaning noble) was added due to its association with Sufi saints.

== History ==
Excavation near Maner in 2012-13 found evidence of habitation as far back as the Chalcolithic period, including a soakage pit, a drain connected to the pit, and various pottery samples such as jars, bowls, and basins. A later period is attributable to the Northern Black Polished Ware culture (c. 700-200 BCE), based on the presence of a few tiny shards of the namesake pottery itself. Various other pottery samples from this period were also found, as well as an iron spearhead and some thirty metal discs apparently made out of an alloy of copper and lead. Evidence of habitation during the Shunga, Kushan, Gupta, and post-Gupta periods was also found.

A now-lost copper plate grant found at Maner, dated to 11 May 1124, indicates that Maner was the seat of a paṭṭalā (district) at that time. The grant records that the Gāhaḍavāla king Govindachandra donated two villages called Guṇāve and Paḍalī, both in the paṭṭalā of Maṇiari (i.e. Maner), to a brāhmaṇa named Gaṇeśvaraśarman. The villages of Guṇāve and Paḍalī were presumably located somewhere near Maner, but their exact locations are unknown.

Later, Maner gained prominence during the medieval period as a center of Sufism:

- 13th century: Became associated with Sufi saint Makhdoom Yahya Maneri
- 1608: Death of Makhdoom Shah Daulat, another prominent Sufi saint
- 1616: Construction of Bari Dargah (Great Shrine) by Ibrahim Khan Kakar, the Mughal governor of Bihar
- 1619: Construction of a mosque by Ibrahim Khan

The town flourished as a center of Islamic learning during the Mughal period.

== Geography ==
Maner is located at 25.65°N 84.88°E on the southern bank of the Ganges river. The Son River meets the Ganges at Haldi Chhapra near Maner.

=== Climate ===
Maner has a Humid subtropical climate (Köppen Cwa) with:

- Hot summers (April–June)
- Monsoon rains (July–September)
- Mild winters (November–February)

== Demographics ==
As of the 2011 census:

- Population: 26,912
- Gender ratio: 947 females per 1000 males
- Literacy rate: 71.12% (higher than state average)
- Major languages: Magahi (94.24%), Hindi (5.76%)

== Administration ==
Maner is a community development block consisting of 38 villages. It is part of the Maner Assembly constituency and Pataliputra Lok Sabha constituency.

== Landmarks ==
=== Religious sites ===
- Bari Dargah: Tomb of Shah Daulat (1616), fine example of Mughal architecture
- Chhoti Dargah: Tomb of Makhdoom Yahya Maneri
- Haldi Chhapra: Confluence of Son and Ganges rivers
- Maner Jain Temple: Ancient Jain pilgrimage site

=== Other attractions ===
- Maner Fort: Ruins of an ancient fort
- British-era bridge over Son River

== Culture ==
=== Festivals ===
- Urs: Annual festival at the dargahs attracting thousands
- Chhath Puja: Celebrated at Haldi Chhapra ghat

=== Cuisine ===
- Maner ka Laddu: Famous sweet made with ghee and chhana
- Traditional Bihari dishes: Litti chokha, Khaja, Thekua

== Economy ==
Maner's economy is primarily based on:

- Agriculture (rice, wheat, maize)
- Small-scale industries
- Religious tourism

The town is famous for its sweet shops, particularly Maner Sweets established in 1935.

== Transport ==
- Road: Connected via NH-922 to Patna and Arrah
- Rail: Nearest station is Danapur (20 km)
- Air: Jay Prakash Narayan International Airport (30 km)

== Education ==
Notable educational institutions:

- Ram Nagina Singh Inter College (established 1948)
- Government Girls High School
- Maner high school (affiliated to Bihar board)
- Topper classes maner (for class 10th and 12th)
